

422001–422100 

|-bgcolor=#fefefe
| 422001 ||  || — || October 29, 2008 || Kitt Peak || Spacewatch || — || align=right data-sort-value="0.62" | 620 m || 
|-id=002 bgcolor=#d6d6d6
| 422002 ||  || — || October 22, 2009 || Mount Lemmon || Mount Lemmon Survey || — || align=right | 3.2 km || 
|-id=003 bgcolor=#d6d6d6
| 422003 ||  || — || October 27, 2009 || Mount Lemmon || Mount Lemmon Survey || EOS || align=right | 1.6 km || 
|-id=004 bgcolor=#E9E9E9
| 422004 ||  || — || April 13, 2004 || Kitt Peak || Spacewatch || — || align=right | 1.3 km || 
|-id=005 bgcolor=#E9E9E9
| 422005 ||  || — || February 2, 2008 || Kitt Peak || Spacewatch || — || align=right | 1.6 km || 
|-id=006 bgcolor=#d6d6d6
| 422006 ||  || — || October 22, 2003 || Haleakala || SDSS || — || align=right | 2.9 km || 
|-id=007 bgcolor=#fefefe
| 422007 ||  || — || September 28, 2001 || Haleakala || NEAT || H || align=right data-sort-value="0.56" | 560 m || 
|-id=008 bgcolor=#E9E9E9
| 422008 ||  || — || November 16, 2000 || Anderson Mesa || LONEOS || — || align=right | 3.1 km || 
|-id=009 bgcolor=#fefefe
| 422009 ||  || — || August 19, 2006 || Haleakala || NEAT || — || align=right | 1.0 km || 
|-id=010 bgcolor=#E9E9E9
| 422010 ||  || — || October 25, 2005 || Kitt Peak || Spacewatch || — || align=right | 2.4 km || 
|-id=011 bgcolor=#fefefe
| 422011 ||  || — || December 18, 2003 || Socorro || LINEAR || — || align=right data-sort-value="0.97" | 970 m || 
|-id=012 bgcolor=#E9E9E9
| 422012 ||  || — || November 22, 2006 || Mount Lemmon || Mount Lemmon Survey || — || align=right | 1.8 km || 
|-id=013 bgcolor=#E9E9E9
| 422013 ||  || — || June 11, 2005 || Kitt Peak || Spacewatch || — || align=right | 1.1 km || 
|-id=014 bgcolor=#E9E9E9
| 422014 ||  || — || August 1, 2001 || Haleakala || NEAT || — || align=right | 1.5 km || 
|-id=015 bgcolor=#fefefe
| 422015 ||  || — || March 1, 2009 || Kitt Peak || Spacewatch || — || align=right data-sort-value="0.73" | 730 m || 
|-id=016 bgcolor=#d6d6d6
| 422016 ||  || — || September 25, 2009 || Kitt Peak || Spacewatch || — || align=right | 2.4 km || 
|-id=017 bgcolor=#fefefe
| 422017 ||  || — || November 21, 2008 || Haleakala || Mount Lemmon Survey || — || align=right data-sort-value="0.59" | 590 m || 
|-id=018 bgcolor=#E9E9E9
| 422018 ||  || — || February 6, 2002 || Haleakala || M. W. Buie || — || align=right | 2.2 km || 
|-id=019 bgcolor=#d6d6d6
| 422019 ||  || — || August 21, 2008 || Kitt Peak || Spacewatch || — || align=right | 2.8 km || 
|-id=020 bgcolor=#E9E9E9
| 422020 ||  || — || August 12, 2001 || La Sagra || NEAT || — || align=right | 2.2 km || 
|-id=021 bgcolor=#E9E9E9
| 422021 ||  || — || January 8, 2007 || Mount Lemmon || Mount Lemmon Survey || — || align=right | 2.3 km || 
|-id=022 bgcolor=#E9E9E9
| 422022 ||  || — || December 27, 2003 || Kitt Peak || Spacewatch || — || align=right | 1.0 km || 
|-id=023 bgcolor=#E9E9E9
| 422023 ||  || — || March 11, 2008 || Mount Lemmon || Mount Lemmon Survey || EUN || align=right | 1.3 km || 
|-id=024 bgcolor=#d6d6d6
| 422024 ||  || — || September 16, 2003 || Kitt Peak || Spacewatch || — || align=right | 2.1 km || 
|-id=025 bgcolor=#E9E9E9
| 422025 ||  || — || January 19, 2004 || Kitt Peak || Spacewatch || — || align=right data-sort-value="0.94" | 940 m || 
|-id=026 bgcolor=#d6d6d6
| 422026 ||  || — || August 18, 2009 || Kitt Peak || Spacewatch || EOS || align=right | 2.0 km || 
|-id=027 bgcolor=#E9E9E9
| 422027 ||  || — || July 22, 2006 || Haleakala || Mount Lemmon Survey || — || align=right data-sort-value="0.87" | 870 m || 
|-id=028 bgcolor=#d6d6d6
| 422028 ||  || — || July 31, 2009 || Kitt Peak || Spacewatch || — || align=right | 2.7 km || 
|-id=029 bgcolor=#d6d6d6
| 422029 ||  || — || August 1, 2003 || Haleakala || NEAT || — || align=right | 3.8 km || 
|-id=030 bgcolor=#E9E9E9
| 422030 ||  || — || October 5, 2002 || Haleakala || NEAT || — || align=right | 1.0 km || 
|-id=031 bgcolor=#fefefe
| 422031 ||  || — || September 10, 2007 || Mount Lemmon || Mount Lemmon Survey || NYS || align=right data-sort-value="0.72" | 720 m || 
|-id=032 bgcolor=#E9E9E9
| 422032 ||  || — || October 2, 2006 || Mount Lemmon || Mount Lemmon Survey || — || align=right data-sort-value="0.98" | 980 m || 
|-id=033 bgcolor=#fefefe
| 422033 ||  || — || April 1, 2005 || Kitt Peak || Spacewatch || — || align=right | 1.0 km || 
|-id=034 bgcolor=#E9E9E9
| 422034 ||  || — || January 28, 2007 || Mount Lemmon || Mount Lemmon Survey || — || align=right | 2.0 km || 
|-id=035 bgcolor=#E9E9E9
| 422035 ||  || — || August 18, 2006 || Kitt Peak || Spacewatch || — || align=right data-sort-value="0.92" | 920 m || 
|-id=036 bgcolor=#E9E9E9
| 422036 ||  || — || December 26, 2006 || Kitt Peak || Spacewatch || — || align=right | 1.5 km || 
|-id=037 bgcolor=#d6d6d6
| 422037 ||  || — || September 25, 2009 || Kitt Peak || Spacewatch || — || align=right | 2.9 km || 
|-id=038 bgcolor=#E9E9E9
| 422038 ||  || — || August 26, 2005 || Haleakala || NEAT || — || align=right | 1.8 km || 
|-id=039 bgcolor=#d6d6d6
| 422039 ||  || — || August 30, 1998 || Kitt Peak || Spacewatch || EOS || align=right | 1.9 km || 
|-id=040 bgcolor=#d6d6d6
| 422040 ||  || — || July 23, 2003 || Haleakala || NEAT || — || align=right | 3.1 km || 
|-id=041 bgcolor=#d6d6d6
| 422041 ||  || — || November 30, 2003 || Kitt Peak || Spacewatch || THM || align=right | 2.5 km || 
|-id=042 bgcolor=#E9E9E9
| 422042 ||  || — || November 22, 2006 || Kitt Peak || Spacewatch || — || align=right | 1.4 km || 
|-id=043 bgcolor=#d6d6d6
| 422043 ||  || — || September 4, 2008 || Kitt Peak || Spacewatch || — || align=right | 3.0 km || 
|-id=044 bgcolor=#fefefe
| 422044 ||  || — || January 26, 2006 || Kitt Peak || Spacewatch || — || align=right data-sort-value="0.67" | 670 m || 
|-id=045 bgcolor=#fefefe
| 422045 ||  || — || September 12, 2007 || Mount Lemmon || Mount Lemmon Survey || — || align=right data-sort-value="0.76" | 760 m || 
|-id=046 bgcolor=#fefefe
| 422046 ||  || — || September 30, 2003 || Kitt Peak || Spacewatch || — || align=right data-sort-value="0.83" | 830 m || 
|-id=047 bgcolor=#d6d6d6
| 422047 ||  || — || November 29, 2005 || Kitt Peak || Spacewatch || KOR || align=right | 1.5 km || 
|-id=048 bgcolor=#fefefe
| 422048 ||  || — || September 15, 2004 || Kitt Peak || Spacewatch || — || align=right data-sort-value="0.60" | 600 m || 
|-id=049 bgcolor=#fefefe
| 422049 ||  || — || March 10, 2005 || Mount Lemmon || Mount Lemmon Survey || — || align=right data-sort-value="0.89" | 890 m || 
|-id=050 bgcolor=#d6d6d6
| 422050 ||  || — || July 6, 2003 || Haleakala || Spacewatch || EOS || align=right | 1.9 km || 
|-id=051 bgcolor=#fefefe
| 422051 ||  || — || November 24, 2003 || Kitt Peak || Spacewatch || MAS || align=right data-sort-value="0.57" | 570 m || 
|-id=052 bgcolor=#d6d6d6
| 422052 ||  || — || September 27, 2003 || Kitt Peak || Spacewatch || — || align=right | 2.5 km || 
|-id=053 bgcolor=#d6d6d6
| 422053 ||  || — || February 25, 2007 || Kitt Peak || Spacewatch || THM || align=right | 2.4 km || 
|-id=054 bgcolor=#fefefe
| 422054 ||  || — || January 16, 2005 || Mauna Kea || P. A. Wiegert || NYS || align=right data-sort-value="0.71" | 710 m || 
|-id=055 bgcolor=#d6d6d6
| 422055 ||  || — || September 25, 2003 || Haleakala || NEAT || — || align=right | 3.5 km || 
|-id=056 bgcolor=#fefefe
| 422056 ||  || — || February 12, 2004 || Haleakala || Spacewatch || — || align=right data-sort-value="0.89" | 890 m || 
|-id=057 bgcolor=#E9E9E9
| 422057 ||  || — || October 30, 2002 || Haleakala || NEAT || — || align=right data-sort-value="0.87" | 870 m || 
|-id=058 bgcolor=#E9E9E9
| 422058 ||  || — || March 7, 2008 || Kitt Peak || Spacewatch ||  || align=right | 2.0 km || 
|-id=059 bgcolor=#d6d6d6
| 422059 ||  || — || March 13, 2007 || Mount Lemmon || Mount Lemmon Survey || — || align=right | 3.4 km || 
|-id=060 bgcolor=#E9E9E9
| 422060 ||  || — || January 27, 2007 || Kitt Peak || Spacewatch || HOF || align=right | 2.6 km || 
|-id=061 bgcolor=#fefefe
| 422061 ||  || — || October 4, 2007 || Mount Lemmon || Mount Lemmon Survey || — || align=right data-sort-value="0.60" | 600 m || 
|-id=062 bgcolor=#E9E9E9
| 422062 ||  || — || October 23, 2006 || Mount Lemmon || Mount Lemmon Survey || — || align=right | 1.5 km || 
|-id=063 bgcolor=#E9E9E9
| 422063 ||  || — || March 19, 2009 || Kitt Peak || Spacewatch || — || align=right | 1.6 km || 
|-id=064 bgcolor=#d6d6d6
| 422064 ||  || — || September 18, 2003 || Kitt Peak || Spacewatch || — || align=right | 2.8 km || 
|-id=065 bgcolor=#E9E9E9
| 422065 ||  || — || April 24, 2008 || Mount Lemmon || Mount Lemmon Survey || — || align=right | 1.8 km || 
|-id=066 bgcolor=#d6d6d6
| 422066 ||  || — || October 11, 2009 || Mount Lemmon || Mount Lemmon Survey || — || align=right | 2.1 km || 
|-id=067 bgcolor=#d6d6d6
| 422067 ||  || — || October 17, 2003 || Kitt Peak || Spacewatch || HYG || align=right | 2.4 km || 
|-id=068 bgcolor=#E9E9E9
| 422068 ||  || — || February 10, 2002 || Socorro || LINEAR || — || align=right | 2.2 km || 
|-id=069 bgcolor=#fefefe
| 422069 ||  || — || September 22, 2003 || Kitt Peak || Spacewatch || — || align=right data-sort-value="0.76" | 760 m || 
|-id=070 bgcolor=#d6d6d6
| 422070 ||  || — || August 19, 2009 || Kitt Peak || Spacewatch || — || align=right | 3.1 km || 
|-id=071 bgcolor=#d6d6d6
| 422071 ||  || — || October 14, 1998 || Kitt Peak || Spacewatch || EOS || align=right | 3.9 km || 
|-id=072 bgcolor=#fefefe
| 422072 ||  || — || February 2, 2006 || Kitt Peak || Spacewatch || — || align=right data-sort-value="0.80" | 800 m || 
|-id=073 bgcolor=#E9E9E9
| 422073 ||  || — || September 26, 2005 || Kitt Peak || Spacewatch || HOF || align=right | 2.5 km || 
|-id=074 bgcolor=#fefefe
| 422074 ||  || — || October 6, 1999 || Kitt Peak || Spacewatch || — || align=right data-sort-value="0.74" | 740 m || 
|-id=075 bgcolor=#E9E9E9
| 422075 ||  || — || March 6, 2008 || Kitt Peak || Spacewatch || — || align=right | 1.3 km || 
|-id=076 bgcolor=#E9E9E9
| 422076 ||  || — || October 31, 2006 || Mount Lemmon || Mount Lemmon Survey || (5) || align=right data-sort-value="0.74" | 740 m || 
|-id=077 bgcolor=#E9E9E9
| 422077 ||  || — || April 30, 2005 || Haleakala || Spacewatch || — || align=right | 1.6 km || 
|-id=078 bgcolor=#d6d6d6
| 422078 ||  || — || September 20, 2003 || Kitt Peak || Spacewatch || — || align=right | 4.8 km || 
|-id=079 bgcolor=#fefefe
| 422079 ||  || — || October 19, 2003 || Kitt Peak || Spacewatch || MAS || align=right data-sort-value="0.90" | 900 m || 
|-id=080 bgcolor=#d6d6d6
| 422080 ||  || — || January 8, 2000 || Kitt Peak || Spacewatch || EOS || align=right | 1.8 km || 
|-id=081 bgcolor=#E9E9E9
| 422081 ||  || — || February 5, 2009 || Mount Lemmon || Mount Lemmon Survey || JUN || align=right | 1.3 km || 
|-id=082 bgcolor=#E9E9E9
| 422082 ||  || — || July 25, 2001 || Kitt Peak || Spacewatch || EUN || align=right | 1.2 km || 
|-id=083 bgcolor=#d6d6d6
| 422083 ||  || — || March 5, 2006 || Kitt Peak || Spacewatch || — || align=right | 5.6 km || 
|-id=084 bgcolor=#fefefe
| 422084 ||  || — || October 23, 2003 || Kitt Peak || Spacewatch || — || align=right | 1.2 km || 
|-id=085 bgcolor=#E9E9E9
| 422085 ||  || — || December 16, 2007 || Mount Lemmon || Mount Lemmon Survey || — || align=right | 1.2 km || 
|-id=086 bgcolor=#fefefe
| 422086 ||  || — || March 1, 1998 || Kitt Peak || Spacewatch || H || align=right data-sort-value="0.65" | 650 m || 
|-id=087 bgcolor=#E9E9E9
| 422087 ||  || — || February 29, 2000 || Socorro || LINEAR || — || align=right | 2.2 km || 
|-id=088 bgcolor=#d6d6d6
| 422088 ||  || — || April 9, 2003 || Haleakala || NEAT || — || align=right | 2.3 km || 
|-id=089 bgcolor=#d6d6d6
| 422089 ||  || — || December 26, 2005 || Kitt Peak || Spacewatch || KOR || align=right | 1.6 km || 
|-id=090 bgcolor=#E9E9E9
| 422090 ||  || — || November 18, 2010 || Kitt Peak || Spacewatch || — || align=right | 1.9 km || 
|-id=091 bgcolor=#fefefe
| 422091 ||  || — || September 17, 2010 || Mount Lemmon || Mount Lemmon Survey || — || align=right data-sort-value="0.76" | 760 m || 
|-id=092 bgcolor=#d6d6d6
| 422092 ||  || — || September 29, 2003 || Haleakala || Spacewatch || — || align=right | 2.4 km || 
|-id=093 bgcolor=#d6d6d6
| 422093 ||  || — || September 6, 2008 || Mount Lemmon || Mount Lemmon Survey || — || align=right | 2.9 km || 
|-id=094 bgcolor=#E9E9E9
| 422094 ||  || — || October 27, 2005 || Haleakala || NEAT || — || align=right | 2.3 km || 
|-id=095 bgcolor=#E9E9E9
| 422095 ||  || — || July 12, 2005 || Kitt Peak || Spacewatch || — || align=right | 2.2 km || 
|-id=096 bgcolor=#d6d6d6
| 422096 ||  || — || August 22, 2004 || Kitt Peak || Spacewatch || — || align=right | 2.8 km || 
|-id=097 bgcolor=#d6d6d6
| 422097 ||  || — || December 4, 2005 || Mount Lemmon || Mount Lemmon Survey || — || align=right | 2.4 km || 
|-id=098 bgcolor=#d6d6d6
| 422098 ||  || — || January 12, 2010 || WISE || WISE || — || align=right | 4.3 km || 
|-id=099 bgcolor=#fefefe
| 422099 ||  || — || October 1, 2003 || Kitt Peak || Spacewatch || V || align=right data-sort-value="0.59" | 590 m || 
|-id=100 bgcolor=#d6d6d6
| 422100 ||  || — || October 23, 2003 || Kitt Peak || Spacewatch || — || align=right | 2.9 km || 
|}

422101–422200 

|-bgcolor=#d6d6d6
| 422101 ||  || — || February 1, 2001 || Kitt Peak || Spacewatch || TIR || align=right | 3.3 km || 
|-id=102 bgcolor=#d6d6d6
| 422102 ||  || — || January 31, 2010 || WISE || WISE || — || align=right | 4.9 km || 
|-id=103 bgcolor=#d6d6d6
| 422103 ||  || — || February 25, 2006 || Kitt Peak || Spacewatch || — || align=right | 2.8 km || 
|-id=104 bgcolor=#E9E9E9
| 422104 ||  || — || October 12, 2005 || Kitt Peak || Spacewatch || AGN || align=right | 1.1 km || 
|-id=105 bgcolor=#E9E9E9
| 422105 ||  || — || October 7, 2005 || Kitt Peak || Spacewatch || — || align=right | 1.9 km || 
|-id=106 bgcolor=#d6d6d6
| 422106 ||  || — || July 28, 2003 || Palomar || NEAT || — || align=right | 5.1 km || 
|-id=107 bgcolor=#E9E9E9
| 422107 ||  || — || October 27, 2005 || Kitt Peak || Spacewatch || — || align=right | 2.5 km || 
|-id=108 bgcolor=#E9E9E9
| 422108 ||  || — || March 5, 2008 || Kitt Peak || Spacewatch || — || align=right data-sort-value="0.97" | 970 m || 
|-id=109 bgcolor=#E9E9E9
| 422109 ||  || — || March 27, 2008 || Mount Lemmon || Mount Lemmon Survey || (5) || align=right | 1.1 km || 
|-id=110 bgcolor=#d6d6d6
| 422110 ||  || — || March 6, 2003 || Anderson Mesa || LONEOS || BRA || align=right | 2.2 km || 
|-id=111 bgcolor=#E9E9E9
| 422111 ||  || — || August 27, 2006 || Kitt Peak || Spacewatch || — || align=right data-sort-value="0.67" | 670 m || 
|-id=112 bgcolor=#E9E9E9
| 422112 ||  || — || September 17, 2010 || Mount Lemmon || Mount Lemmon Survey ||  || align=right | 1.8 km || 
|-id=113 bgcolor=#E9E9E9
| 422113 ||  || — || August 27, 2001 || Kitt Peak || Spacewatch || — || align=right | 1.3 km || 
|-id=114 bgcolor=#d6d6d6
| 422114 ||  || — || November 1, 2005 || Mount Lemmon || Mount Lemmon Survey || KOR || align=right | 1.5 km || 
|-id=115 bgcolor=#fefefe
| 422115 ||  || — || January 13, 2005 || Kitt Peak || Spacewatch || NYS || align=right data-sort-value="0.55" | 550 m || 
|-id=116 bgcolor=#E9E9E9
| 422116 ||  || — || January 9, 2007 || Mount Lemmon || Mount Lemmon Survey || — || align=right | 2.2 km || 
|-id=117 bgcolor=#d6d6d6
| 422117 ||  || — || October 14, 2010 || Mount Lemmon || Mount Lemmon Survey || KOR || align=right | 1.2 km || 
|-id=118 bgcolor=#fefefe
| 422118 ||  || — || October 9, 2007 || Kitt Peak || Spacewatch || — || align=right data-sort-value="0.86" | 860 m || 
|-id=119 bgcolor=#d6d6d6
| 422119 ||  || — || September 15, 2009 || Kitt Peak || Spacewatch || EOS || align=right | 1.6 km || 
|-id=120 bgcolor=#d6d6d6
| 422120 ||  || — || January 9, 2006 || Kitt Peak || Spacewatch || — || align=right | 3.0 km || 
|-id=121 bgcolor=#fefefe
| 422121 ||  || — || November 14, 2007 || Kitt Peak || Spacewatch || — || align=right data-sort-value="0.80" | 800 m || 
|-id=122 bgcolor=#d6d6d6
| 422122 ||  || — || January 15, 2005 || Kitt Peak || Spacewatch || — || align=right | 3.6 km || 
|-id=123 bgcolor=#fefefe
| 422123 ||  || — || October 3, 2003 || Kitt Peak || Spacewatch || critical || align=right data-sort-value="0.62" | 620 m || 
|-id=124 bgcolor=#E9E9E9
| 422124 ||  || — || August 29, 2005 || Kitt Peak || Spacewatch || — || align=right | 2.2 km || 
|-id=125 bgcolor=#d6d6d6
| 422125 ||  || — || August 18, 2009 || Kitt Peak || Spacewatch || — || align=right | 2.0 km || 
|-id=126 bgcolor=#E9E9E9
| 422126 ||  || — || October 25, 2005 || Kitt Peak || Spacewatch || HOF || align=right | 2.3 km || 
|-id=127 bgcolor=#d6d6d6
| 422127 ||  || — || September 4, 2003 || Kitt Peak || Spacewatch || — || align=right | 2.9 km || 
|-id=128 bgcolor=#E9E9E9
| 422128 ||  || — || November 28, 2005 || Kitt Peak || Spacewatch || GEF || align=right | 1.5 km || 
|-id=129 bgcolor=#d6d6d6
| 422129 ||  || — || October 27, 2008 || Mount Lemmon || Mount Lemmon Survey || SYL7:4 || align=right | 4.6 km || 
|-id=130 bgcolor=#fefefe
| 422130 ||  || — || September 3, 1999 || Kitt Peak || Spacewatch || — || align=right data-sort-value="0.54" | 540 m || 
|-id=131 bgcolor=#d6d6d6
| 422131 ||  || — || February 21, 2007 || Kitt Peak || Spacewatch || — || align=right | 2.2 km || 
|-id=132 bgcolor=#E9E9E9
| 422132 ||  || — || April 22, 2009 || Mount Lemmon || Mount Lemmon Survey || — || align=right | 1.0 km || 
|-id=133 bgcolor=#E9E9E9
| 422133 ||  || — || October 30, 2005 || Kitt Peak || Spacewatch || — || align=right | 2.9 km || 
|-id=134 bgcolor=#d6d6d6
| 422134 ||  || — || November 18, 2009 || Mount Lemmon || Mount Lemmon Survey || — || align=right | 3.0 km || 
|-id=135 bgcolor=#E9E9E9
| 422135 ||  || — || November 24, 2006 || Kitt Peak || Spacewatch || MIS || align=right | 2.5 km || 
|-id=136 bgcolor=#fefefe
| 422136 ||  || — || September 12, 2007 || Catalina || CSS || — || align=right data-sort-value="0.87" | 870 m || 
|-id=137 bgcolor=#fefefe
| 422137 ||  || — || August 16, 2006 || Palomar || NEAT || — || align=right data-sort-value="0.87" | 870 m || 
|-id=138 bgcolor=#fefefe
| 422138 ||  || — || October 5, 2004 || Kitt Peak || Spacewatch || — || align=right data-sort-value="0.64" | 640 m || 
|-id=139 bgcolor=#d6d6d6
| 422139 ||  || — || October 15, 2009 || Mount Lemmon || Mount Lemmon Survey || — || align=right | 2.2 km || 
|-id=140 bgcolor=#d6d6d6
| 422140 ||  || — || September 27, 2009 || Mount Lemmon || Mount Lemmon Survey || — || align=right | 2.5 km || 
|-id=141 bgcolor=#E9E9E9
| 422141 ||  || — || November 12, 2001 || Socorro || LINEAR || — || align=right | 1.9 km || 
|-id=142 bgcolor=#E9E9E9
| 422142 ||  || — || January 30, 2008 || Kitt Peak || Spacewatch || — || align=right | 1.5 km || 
|-id=143 bgcolor=#d6d6d6
| 422143 ||  || — || December 13, 1999 || Kitt Peak || Spacewatch || 3:2 || align=right | 4.7 km || 
|-id=144 bgcolor=#E9E9E9
| 422144 ||  || — || October 27, 2005 || Kitt Peak || Spacewatch || AGN || align=right | 1.1 km || 
|-id=145 bgcolor=#E9E9E9
| 422145 ||  || — || July 5, 2005 || Siding Spring || SSS || — || align=right | 1.6 km || 
|-id=146 bgcolor=#d6d6d6
| 422146 ||  || — || March 10, 2005 || Mount Lemmon || Mount Lemmon Survey || — || align=right | 2.1 km || 
|-id=147 bgcolor=#d6d6d6
| 422147 ||  || — || November 16, 2009 || Mount Lemmon || Mount Lemmon Survey || — || align=right | 2.9 km || 
|-id=148 bgcolor=#E9E9E9
| 422148 ||  || — || January 10, 2007 || Kitt Peak || Spacewatch || — || align=right | 1.3 km || 
|-id=149 bgcolor=#d6d6d6
| 422149 ||  || — || March 11, 2010 || WISE || WISE || — || align=right | 2.1 km || 
|-id=150 bgcolor=#fefefe
| 422150 ||  || — || May 31, 2006 || Mount Lemmon || Mount Lemmon Survey || — || align=right data-sort-value="0.84" | 840 m || 
|-id=151 bgcolor=#d6d6d6
| 422151 ||  || — || October 2, 2008 || Catalina || CSS || Tj (2.97) || align=right | 4.0 km || 
|-id=152 bgcolor=#E9E9E9
| 422152 ||  || — || April 5, 2008 || Mount Lemmon || Mount Lemmon Survey || — || align=right | 1.2 km || 
|-id=153 bgcolor=#fefefe
| 422153 ||  || — || January 1, 2009 || Mount Lemmon || Mount Lemmon Survey || — || align=right | 2.0 km || 
|-id=154 bgcolor=#fefefe
| 422154 ||  || — || September 27, 2003 || Kitt Peak || Spacewatch || — || align=right data-sort-value="0.98" | 980 m || 
|-id=155 bgcolor=#d6d6d6
| 422155 ||  || — || November 1, 2005 || Kitt Peak || Spacewatch || KOR || align=right | 1.5 km || 
|-id=156 bgcolor=#d6d6d6
| 422156 ||  || — || October 30, 2005 || Kitt Peak || Spacewatch || KOR || align=right | 1.3 km || 
|-id=157 bgcolor=#fefefe
| 422157 ||  || — || January 6, 2005 || Catalina || CSS || — || align=right data-sort-value="0.85" | 850 m || 
|-id=158 bgcolor=#d6d6d6
| 422158 ||  || — || December 30, 2005 || Kitt Peak || Spacewatch || EOS || align=right | 1.9 km || 
|-id=159 bgcolor=#d6d6d6
| 422159 ||  || — || January 31, 2006 || Kitt Peak || Spacewatch || — || align=right | 3.0 km || 
|-id=160 bgcolor=#E9E9E9
| 422160 ||  || — || November 30, 2010 || Mount Lemmon || Mount Lemmon Survey || — || align=right | 1.1 km || 
|-id=161 bgcolor=#fefefe
| 422161 ||  || — || February 9, 2008 || Kitt Peak || Spacewatch || — || align=right data-sort-value="0.87" | 870 m || 
|-id=162 bgcolor=#fefefe
| 422162 ||  || — || September 3, 2007 || Catalina || CSS || — || align=right data-sort-value="0.77" | 770 m || 
|-id=163 bgcolor=#fefefe
| 422163 ||  || — || November 9, 1999 || Socorro || LINEAR || MAS || align=right data-sort-value="0.93" | 930 m || 
|-id=164 bgcolor=#E9E9E9
| 422164 ||  || — || March 12, 2005 || Kitt Peak || Spacewatch || — || align=right data-sort-value="0.77" | 770 m || 
|-id=165 bgcolor=#E9E9E9
| 422165 ||  || — || March 24, 2012 || Mount Lemmon || Mount Lemmon Survey || — || align=right | 2.1 km || 
|-id=166 bgcolor=#fefefe
| 422166 ||  || — || October 28, 2005 || Kitt Peak || Spacewatch || — || align=right data-sort-value="0.57" | 570 m || 
|-id=167 bgcolor=#E9E9E9
| 422167 ||  || — || April 2, 2009 || Kitt Peak || Spacewatch || — || align=right data-sort-value="0.89" | 890 m || 
|-id=168 bgcolor=#E9E9E9
| 422168 ||  || — || October 30, 2010 || Kitt Peak || Spacewatch || — || align=right | 1.7 km || 
|-id=169 bgcolor=#d6d6d6
| 422169 ||  || — || March 16, 2007 || Kitt Peak || Spacewatch || — || align=right | 3.5 km || 
|-id=170 bgcolor=#d6d6d6
| 422170 ||  || — || February 12, 2010 || WISE || WISE || — || align=right | 4.0 km || 
|-id=171 bgcolor=#fefefe
| 422171 ||  || — || September 20, 1995 || Kitt Peak || Spacewatch || MAS || align=right data-sort-value="0.78" | 780 m || 
|-id=172 bgcolor=#E9E9E9
| 422172 ||  || — || September 14, 2005 || Kitt Peak || Spacewatch || EUN || align=right | 1.5 km || 
|-id=173 bgcolor=#E9E9E9
| 422173 ||  || — || November 28, 2005 || Mount Lemmon || Mount Lemmon Survey || — || align=right | 3.1 km || 
|-id=174 bgcolor=#fefefe
| 422174 ||  || — || November 4, 2004 || Catalina || CSS || — || align=right data-sort-value="0.86" | 860 m || 
|-id=175 bgcolor=#E9E9E9
| 422175 ||  || — || July 23, 2010 || WISE || WISE || — || align=right | 2.0 km || 
|-id=176 bgcolor=#fefefe
| 422176 ||  || — || October 2, 2003 || Kitt Peak || Spacewatch || — || align=right data-sort-value="0.73" | 730 m || 
|-id=177 bgcolor=#fefefe
| 422177 ||  || — || November 28, 2003 || Lvye || Spacewatch || — || align=right data-sort-value="0.82" | 820 m || 
|-id=178 bgcolor=#E9E9E9
| 422178 ||  || — || August 27, 2001 || Kitt Peak || Spacewatch || — || align=right | 1.8 km || 
|-id=179 bgcolor=#d6d6d6
| 422179 ||  || — || December 2, 2004 || Kitt Peak || Spacewatch || — || align=right | 3.9 km || 
|-id=180 bgcolor=#d6d6d6
| 422180 ||  || — || December 27, 2005 || Kitt Peak || Spacewatch || — || align=right | 4.0 km || 
|-id=181 bgcolor=#fefefe
| 422181 ||  || — || December 29, 2011 || Mount Lemmon || Mount Lemmon Survey || V || align=right data-sort-value="0.65" | 650 m || 
|-id=182 bgcolor=#fefefe
| 422182 ||  || — || May 24, 2006 || Kitt Peak || Spacewatch || — || align=right data-sort-value="0.82" | 820 m || 
|-id=183 bgcolor=#E9E9E9
| 422183 ||  || — || March 16, 2004 || Kitt Peak || Spacewatch || — || align=right | 2.0 km || 
|-id=184 bgcolor=#d6d6d6
| 422184 ||  || — || September 19, 2003 || Palomar || NEAT || — || align=right | 5.1 km || 
|-id=185 bgcolor=#d6d6d6
| 422185 ||  || — || October 27, 2009 || Mount Lemmon || Mount Lemmon Survey || — || align=right | 4.7 km || 
|-id=186 bgcolor=#fefefe
| 422186 ||  || — || October 23, 2003 || Anderson Mesa || LONEOS || — || align=right data-sort-value="0.78" | 780 m || 
|-id=187 bgcolor=#d6d6d6
| 422187 ||  || — || October 27, 2009 || Catalina || CSS || — || align=right | 3.7 km || 
|-id=188 bgcolor=#d6d6d6
| 422188 ||  || — || August 29, 2006 || Kitt Peak || Spacewatch || 3:2 || align=right | 5.6 km || 
|-id=189 bgcolor=#d6d6d6
| 422189 ||  || — || January 31, 2006 || Kitt Peak || Spacewatch || — || align=right | 3.0 km || 
|-id=190 bgcolor=#d6d6d6
| 422190 ||  || — || August 26, 1998 || Kitt Peak || Spacewatch || — || align=right | 2.9 km || 
|-id=191 bgcolor=#d6d6d6
| 422191 ||  || — || December 27, 2005 || Kitt Peak || Spacewatch || — || align=right | 3.3 km || 
|-id=192 bgcolor=#d6d6d6
| 422192 ||  || — || November 4, 2005 || Mount Lemmon || Mount Lemmon Survey || — || align=right | 2.3 km || 
|-id=193 bgcolor=#fefefe
| 422193 ||  || — || October 19, 1995 || Kitt Peak || Spacewatch || MAS || align=right data-sort-value="0.93" | 930 m || 
|-id=194 bgcolor=#fefefe
| 422194 ||  || — || September 7, 2004 || Kitt Peak || Spacewatch || — || align=right data-sort-value="0.71" | 710 m || 
|-id=195 bgcolor=#fefefe
| 422195 ||  || — || September 28, 2003 || Kitt Peak || Spacewatch || — || align=right data-sort-value="0.78" | 780 m || 
|-id=196 bgcolor=#d6d6d6
| 422196 ||  || — || March 12, 2002 || Kitt Peak || Spacewatch || — || align=right | 2.8 km || 
|-id=197 bgcolor=#d6d6d6
| 422197 ||  || — || June 20, 2002 || La Palma || S. Collander-Brown, A. Fitzsimmons || — || align=right | 4.1 km || 
|-id=198 bgcolor=#fefefe
| 422198 ||  || — || November 11, 2004 || Kitt Peak || Spacewatch || — || align=right data-sort-value="0.96" | 960 m || 
|-id=199 bgcolor=#fefefe
| 422199 ||  || — || December 11, 2004 || Kitt Peak || Spacewatch || — || align=right data-sort-value="0.50" | 500 m || 
|-id=200 bgcolor=#d6d6d6
| 422200 ||  || — || October 5, 2004 || Kitt Peak || Spacewatch || — || align=right | 2.0 km || 
|}

422201–422300 

|-bgcolor=#d6d6d6
| 422201 ||  || — || May 12, 2007 || Mount Lemmon || Mount Lemmon Survey || — || align=right | 3.1 km || 
|-id=202 bgcolor=#d6d6d6
| 422202 ||  || — || September 19, 2003 || Kitt Peak || Spacewatch || — || align=right | 2.9 km || 
|-id=203 bgcolor=#d6d6d6
| 422203 ||  || — || December 18, 2004 || Mount Lemmon || Mount Lemmon Survey || — || align=right | 3.1 km || 
|-id=204 bgcolor=#fefefe
| 422204 ||  || — || February 14, 2005 || Kitt Peak || Spacewatch || — || align=right data-sort-value="0.78" | 780 m || 
|-id=205 bgcolor=#d6d6d6
| 422205 ||  || — || October 2, 2003 || Kitt Peak || Spacewatch || — || align=right | 3.1 km || 
|-id=206 bgcolor=#d6d6d6
| 422206 ||  || — || September 21, 2003 || Kitt Peak || Spacewatch || — || align=right | 3.3 km || 
|-id=207 bgcolor=#fefefe
| 422207 ||  || — || April 4, 2005 || Mount Lemmon || Mount Lemmon Survey || — || align=right | 1.1 km || 
|-id=208 bgcolor=#d6d6d6
| 422208 ||  || — || March 5, 2006 || Kitt Peak || Spacewatch || — || align=right | 3.0 km || 
|-id=209 bgcolor=#E9E9E9
| 422209 ||  || — || October 14, 2001 || Kitt Peak || Spacewatch || — || align=right | 1.3 km || 
|-id=210 bgcolor=#E9E9E9
| 422210 ||  || — || December 17, 2001 || Socorro || LINEAR || — || align=right | 3.7 km || 
|-id=211 bgcolor=#fefefe
| 422211 ||  || — || April 8, 2006 || Kitt Peak || Spacewatch || — || align=right data-sort-value="0.73" | 730 m || 
|-id=212 bgcolor=#d6d6d6
| 422212 ||  || — || April 27, 2001 || Kitt Peak || Spacewatch || VER || align=right | 2.5 km || 
|-id=213 bgcolor=#E9E9E9
| 422213 ||  || — || October 30, 2006 || Catalina || CSS || — || align=right data-sort-value="0.91" | 910 m || 
|-id=214 bgcolor=#d6d6d6
| 422214 ||  || — || April 25, 2007 || Kitt Peak || Spacewatch || EOS || align=right | 2.3 km || 
|-id=215 bgcolor=#fefefe
| 422215 ||  || — || September 29, 2003 || Kitt Peak || Spacewatch || — || align=right data-sort-value="0.78" | 780 m || 
|-id=216 bgcolor=#E9E9E9
| 422216 ||  || — || October 4, 2006 || Mount Lemmon || Mount Lemmon Survey || — || align=right | 1.9 km || 
|-id=217 bgcolor=#fefefe
| 422217 ||  || — || January 9, 2002 || Campo Imperatore || CINEOS || — || align=right data-sort-value="0.82" | 820 m || 
|-id=218 bgcolor=#d6d6d6
| 422218 ||  || — || August 27, 2003 || Palomar || NEAT || — || align=right | 2.9 km || 
|-id=219 bgcolor=#fefefe
| 422219 ||  || — || July 6, 2000 || Anderson Mesa || LONEOS || — || align=right data-sort-value="0.85" | 850 m || 
|-id=220 bgcolor=#d6d6d6
| 422220 ||  || — || October 27, 2009 || Mount Lemmon || Mount Lemmon Survey || — || align=right | 4.0 km || 
|-id=221 bgcolor=#fefefe
| 422221 ||  || — || November 30, 2008 || Kitt Peak || Spacewatch || — || align=right | 1.0 km || 
|-id=222 bgcolor=#fefefe
| 422222 ||  || — || October 5, 2004 || Palomar || NEAT || — || align=right | 1.0 km || 
|-id=223 bgcolor=#d6d6d6
| 422223 ||  || — || March 23, 2003 || Apache Point || SDSS || — || align=right | 2.5 km || 
|-id=224 bgcolor=#d6d6d6
| 422224 ||  || — || July 20, 2003 || Palomar || NEAT || — || align=right | 2.8 km || 
|-id=225 bgcolor=#fefefe
| 422225 ||  || — || September 7, 1999 || Socorro || LINEAR || — || align=right | 1.2 km || 
|-id=226 bgcolor=#E9E9E9
| 422226 ||  || — || September 17, 2001 || Anderson Mesa || LONEOS || — || align=right | 1.9 km || 
|-id=227 bgcolor=#fefefe
| 422227 ||  || — || April 9, 2010 || Mount Lemmon || Mount Lemmon Survey || — || align=right data-sort-value="0.80" | 800 m || 
|-id=228 bgcolor=#fefefe
| 422228 ||  || — || January 28, 2004 || Kitt Peak || Spacewatch || — || align=right | 1.8 km || 
|-id=229 bgcolor=#fefefe
| 422229 ||  || — || November 14, 2007 || Kitt Peak || Spacewatch || V || align=right data-sort-value="0.81" | 810 m || 
|-id=230 bgcolor=#fefefe
| 422230 ||  || — || December 14, 2007 || Mount Lemmon || Mount Lemmon Survey || NYS || align=right data-sort-value="0.78" | 780 m || 
|-id=231 bgcolor=#E9E9E9
| 422231 ||  || — || October 21, 2001 || Socorro || LINEAR || — || align=right | 2.5 km || 
|-id=232 bgcolor=#fefefe
| 422232 ||  || — || July 17, 2010 || Siding Spring || SSS || — || align=right | 1.2 km || 
|-id=233 bgcolor=#d6d6d6
| 422233 ||  || — || October 12, 2009 || Mount Lemmon || Mount Lemmon Survey || HYG || align=right | 2.3 km || 
|-id=234 bgcolor=#d6d6d6
| 422234 ||  || — || March 11, 2007 || Mount Lemmon || Mount Lemmon Survey || — || align=right | 2.2 km || 
|-id=235 bgcolor=#E9E9E9
| 422235 ||  || — || October 7, 2005 || Kitt Peak || Spacewatch || PAD || align=right | 1.5 km || 
|-id=236 bgcolor=#E9E9E9
| 422236 ||  || — || July 7, 2005 || Kitt Peak || Spacewatch || — || align=right | 1.5 km || 
|-id=237 bgcolor=#d6d6d6
| 422237 ||  || — || September 24, 1960 || Palomar || PLS || — || align=right | 3.0 km || 
|-id=238 bgcolor=#E9E9E9
| 422238 ||  || — || February 7, 2007 || Mount Lemmon || Mount Lemmon Survey || AGN || align=right | 1.3 km || 
|-id=239 bgcolor=#fefefe
| 422239 ||  || — || March 24, 2009 || Mount Lemmon || Mount Lemmon Survey || — || align=right data-sort-value="0.87" | 870 m || 
|-id=240 bgcolor=#fefefe
| 422240 ||  || — || March 17, 2010 || Kitt Peak || Spacewatch || — || align=right data-sort-value="0.89" | 890 m || 
|-id=241 bgcolor=#fefefe
| 422241 ||  || — || November 20, 2007 || Kitt Peak || Spacewatch || — || align=right data-sort-value="0.89" | 890 m || 
|-id=242 bgcolor=#d6d6d6
| 422242 ||  || — || October 16, 2009 || Mount Lemmon || Mount Lemmon Survey || — || align=right | 2.8 km || 
|-id=243 bgcolor=#E9E9E9
| 422243 ||  || — || August 29, 2006 || Kitt Peak || Spacewatch || — || align=right | 1.2 km || 
|-id=244 bgcolor=#fefefe
| 422244 ||  || — || February 10, 2002 || Socorro || LINEAR || — || align=right data-sort-value="0.98" | 980 m || 
|-id=245 bgcolor=#fefefe
| 422245 ||  || — || October 13, 2004 || Kitt Peak || Spacewatch || — || align=right data-sort-value="0.85" | 850 m || 
|-id=246 bgcolor=#E9E9E9
| 422246 ||  || — || March 13, 1999 || Kitt Peak || Spacewatch || — || align=right | 2.2 km || 
|-id=247 bgcolor=#fefefe
| 422247 ||  || — || August 7, 2000 || Haleakala || NEAT || — || align=right data-sort-value="0.85" | 850 m || 
|-id=248 bgcolor=#fefefe
| 422248 ||  || — || October 24, 2003 || Kitt Peak || Spacewatch || — || align=right data-sort-value="0.98" | 980 m || 
|-id=249 bgcolor=#d6d6d6
| 422249 ||  || — || February 25, 2006 || Mount Lemmon || Mount Lemmon Survey || VER || align=right | 3.5 km || 
|-id=250 bgcolor=#E9E9E9
| 422250 ||  || — || October 9, 2005 || Kitt Peak || Spacewatch || — || align=right | 2.2 km || 
|-id=251 bgcolor=#E9E9E9
| 422251 ||  || — || July 7, 2010 || WISE || WISE || — || align=right | 1.7 km || 
|-id=252 bgcolor=#E9E9E9
| 422252 ||  || — || October 13, 2005 || Kitt Peak || Spacewatch || DOR || align=right | 2.2 km || 
|-id=253 bgcolor=#fefefe
| 422253 ||  || — || September 14, 2007 || Kitt Peak || Spacewatch || — || align=right data-sort-value="0.45" | 450 m || 
|-id=254 bgcolor=#E9E9E9
| 422254 ||  || — || October 20, 2006 || Kitt Peak || Spacewatch || — || align=right data-sort-value="0.82" | 820 m || 
|-id=255 bgcolor=#d6d6d6
| 422255 ||  || — || March 9, 2007 || Mount Lemmon || Mount Lemmon Survey || KOR || align=right | 1.2 km || 
|-id=256 bgcolor=#E9E9E9
| 422256 ||  || — || October 3, 2006 || Mount Lemmon || Mount Lemmon Survey || — || align=right | 1.1 km || 
|-id=257 bgcolor=#E9E9E9
| 422257 ||  || — || November 1, 2006 || Mount Lemmon || Mount Lemmon Survey || — || align=right | 1.5 km || 
|-id=258 bgcolor=#E9E9E9
| 422258 ||  || — || June 23, 1995 || Kitt Peak || Spacewatch || — || align=right | 1.8 km || 
|-id=259 bgcolor=#E9E9E9
| 422259 ||  || — || February 10, 2002 || Socorro || LINEAR || — || align=right | 2.7 km || 
|-id=260 bgcolor=#E9E9E9
| 422260 ||  || — || August 28, 2005 || Anderson Mesa || LONEOS || — || align=right | 2.7 km || 
|-id=261 bgcolor=#E9E9E9
| 422261 ||  || — || November 17, 2006 || Mount Lemmon || Mount Lemmon Survey || — || align=right | 1.5 km || 
|-id=262 bgcolor=#d6d6d6
| 422262 ||  || — || September 3, 2008 || Kitt Peak || Spacewatch || — || align=right | 3.4 km || 
|-id=263 bgcolor=#E9E9E9
| 422263 ||  || — || October 12, 1977 || Palomar || PLS || — || align=right | 1.0 km || 
|-id=264 bgcolor=#E9E9E9
| 422264 ||  || — || October 19, 2001 || Palomar || NEAT || — || align=right | 1.5 km || 
|-id=265 bgcolor=#d6d6d6
| 422265 ||  || — || September 24, 1960 || Palomar || PLS || — || align=right | 1.9 km || 
|-id=266 bgcolor=#E9E9E9
| 422266 ||  || — || September 16, 2004 || Kitt Peak || Spacewatch || — || align=right | 2.3 km || 
|-id=267 bgcolor=#E9E9E9
| 422267 ||  || — || June 16, 2005 || Kitt Peak || Spacewatch || — || align=right | 1.2 km || 
|-id=268 bgcolor=#E9E9E9
| 422268 ||  || — || October 15, 2001 || Palomar || NEAT || — || align=right | 1.9 km || 
|-id=269 bgcolor=#E9E9E9
| 422269 ||  || — || October 23, 2005 || Catalina || CSS || DOR || align=right | 2.4 km || 
|-id=270 bgcolor=#E9E9E9
| 422270 ||  || — || December 14, 2001 || Socorro || LINEAR || — || align=right | 2.3 km || 
|-id=271 bgcolor=#d6d6d6
| 422271 ||  || — || September 17, 2003 || Palomar || NEAT || EOS || align=right | 2.1 km || 
|-id=272 bgcolor=#fefefe
| 422272 ||  || — || November 9, 2007 || Kitt Peak || Spacewatch || — || align=right data-sort-value="0.84" | 840 m || 
|-id=273 bgcolor=#E9E9E9
| 422273 ||  || — || September 14, 2005 || Kitt Peak || Spacewatch || — || align=right | 2.3 km || 
|-id=274 bgcolor=#E9E9E9
| 422274 ||  || — || September 11, 2010 || Mount Lemmon || Mount Lemmon Survey || — || align=right | 1.3 km || 
|-id=275 bgcolor=#E9E9E9
| 422275 ||  || — || February 10, 2008 || Kitt Peak || Spacewatch || MIS || align=right | 2.8 km || 
|-id=276 bgcolor=#E9E9E9
| 422276 ||  || — || October 11, 2001 || Palomar || NEAT || EUN || align=right | 1.3 km || 
|-id=277 bgcolor=#fefefe
| 422277 ||  || — || October 20, 2003 || Kitt Peak || Spacewatch || — || align=right data-sort-value="0.86" | 860 m || 
|-id=278 bgcolor=#d6d6d6
| 422278 ||  || — || July 25, 2003 || Palomar || NEAT || — || align=right | 3.2 km || 
|-id=279 bgcolor=#d6d6d6
| 422279 ||  || — || October 2, 2008 || Mount Lemmon || Mount Lemmon Survey || — || align=right | 4.5 km || 
|-id=280 bgcolor=#fefefe
| 422280 ||  || — || September 19, 2003 || Kitt Peak || Spacewatch || — || align=right data-sort-value="0.68" | 680 m || 
|-id=281 bgcolor=#fefefe
| 422281 ||  || — || October 11, 1999 || Kitt Peak || Spacewatch || NYS || align=right data-sort-value="0.79" | 790 m || 
|-id=282 bgcolor=#d6d6d6
| 422282 ||  || — || November 10, 2004 || Kitt Peak || Spacewatch || — || align=right | 3.0 km || 
|-id=283 bgcolor=#E9E9E9
| 422283 ||  || — || April 6, 2000 || Socorro || LINEAR || MAR || align=right | 1.0 km || 
|-id=284 bgcolor=#fefefe
| 422284 ||  || — || March 25, 2006 || Mount Lemmon || Mount Lemmon Survey || — || align=right data-sort-value="0.79" | 790 m || 
|-id=285 bgcolor=#fefefe
| 422285 ||  || — || October 19, 2003 || Kitt Peak || Spacewatch || NYS || align=right data-sort-value="0.67" | 670 m || 
|-id=286 bgcolor=#fefefe
| 422286 ||  || — || September 18, 2003 || Kitt Peak || Spacewatch || — || align=right data-sort-value="0.84" | 840 m || 
|-id=287 bgcolor=#E9E9E9
| 422287 ||  || — || October 22, 2006 || Catalina || CSS || — || align=right | 1.4 km || 
|-id=288 bgcolor=#d6d6d6
| 422288 ||  || — || October 1, 2003 || Kitt Peak || Spacewatch || — || align=right | 2.7 km || 
|-id=289 bgcolor=#fefefe
| 422289 ||  || — || March 31, 2009 || Mount Lemmon || Mount Lemmon Survey || V || align=right data-sort-value="0.60" | 600 m || 
|-id=290 bgcolor=#d6d6d6
| 422290 ||  || — || April 5, 2000 || Socorro || LINEAR || — || align=right | 4.8 km || 
|-id=291 bgcolor=#E9E9E9
| 422291 ||  || — || October 19, 2010 || Mount Lemmon || Mount Lemmon Survey || — || align=right | 1.6 km || 
|-id=292 bgcolor=#d6d6d6
| 422292 ||  || — || September 22, 2003 || Kitt Peak || Spacewatch || — || align=right | 3.3 km || 
|-id=293 bgcolor=#d6d6d6
| 422293 ||  || — || October 27, 2003 || Kitt Peak || Spacewatch || — || align=right | 3.3 km || 
|-id=294 bgcolor=#d6d6d6
| 422294 ||  || — || September 4, 2003 || Kitt Peak || Spacewatch || — || align=right | 2.1 km || 
|-id=295 bgcolor=#E9E9E9
| 422295 ||  || — || September 30, 2006 || Mount Lemmon || Mount Lemmon Survey || — || align=right | 1.4 km || 
|-id=296 bgcolor=#E9E9E9
| 422296 ||  || — || October 1, 2005 || Mount Lemmon || Mount Lemmon Survey || — || align=right | 1.9 km || 
|-id=297 bgcolor=#d6d6d6
| 422297 ||  || — || September 20, 2008 || Mount Lemmon || Mount Lemmon Survey || — || align=right | 2.8 km || 
|-id=298 bgcolor=#fefefe
| 422298 ||  || — || August 10, 2007 || Kitt Peak || Spacewatch || — || align=right data-sort-value="0.70" | 700 m || 
|-id=299 bgcolor=#E9E9E9
| 422299 ||  || — || November 1, 2000 || Kitt Peak || Spacewatch || — || align=right | 2.1 km || 
|-id=300 bgcolor=#d6d6d6
| 422300 ||  || — || September 19, 2003 || Campo Imperatore || CINEOS || — || align=right | 2.1 km || 
|}

422301–422400 

|-bgcolor=#d6d6d6
| 422301 ||  || — || March 13, 2007 || Kitt Peak || Spacewatch || BRA || align=right | 1.5 km || 
|-id=302 bgcolor=#E9E9E9
| 422302 ||  || — || May 19, 2004 || Campo Imperatore || CINEOS || — || align=right | 1.6 km || 
|-id=303 bgcolor=#d6d6d6
| 422303 ||  || — || September 28, 2003 || Haleakala || LINEAR || EOS || align=right | 2.0 km || 
|-id=304 bgcolor=#fefefe
| 422304 ||  || — || October 9, 2004 || Socorro || LINEAR || — || align=right data-sort-value="0.66" | 660 m || 
|-id=305 bgcolor=#E9E9E9
| 422305 ||  || — || October 25, 2005 || Kitt Peak || Spacewatch || — || align=right | 2.3 km || 
|-id=306 bgcolor=#E9E9E9
| 422306 ||  || — || March 27, 2008 || Kitt Peak || Spacewatch || (5) || align=right data-sort-value="0.93" | 930 m || 
|-id=307 bgcolor=#fefefe
| 422307 ||  || — || September 7, 1999 || Kitt Peak || Spacewatch || NYS || align=right data-sort-value="0.70" | 700 m || 
|-id=308 bgcolor=#E9E9E9
| 422308 ||  || — || February 24, 2012 || Kitt Peak || Spacewatch || — || align=right | 2.1 km || 
|-id=309 bgcolor=#d6d6d6
| 422309 ||  || — || September 24, 2008 || Mount Lemmon || Mount Lemmon Survey || — || align=right | 3.1 km || 
|-id=310 bgcolor=#E9E9E9
| 422310 ||  || — || October 2, 1997 || Caussols || ODAS || — || align=right | 1.3 km || 
|-id=311 bgcolor=#fefefe
| 422311 ||  || — || September 19, 2001 || Socorro || LINEAR || — || align=right data-sort-value="0.63" | 630 m || 
|-id=312 bgcolor=#E9E9E9
| 422312 ||  || — || March 26, 2008 || Mount Lemmon || Mount Lemmon Survey || — || align=right | 1.4 km || 
|-id=313 bgcolor=#fefefe
| 422313 ||  || — || May 21, 2010 || WISE || WISE || — || align=right | 2.9 km || 
|-id=314 bgcolor=#fefefe
| 422314 ||  || — || January 13, 2008 || Mount Lemmon || Mount Lemmon Survey || — || align=right data-sort-value="0.68" | 680 m || 
|-id=315 bgcolor=#fefefe
| 422315 ||  || — || June 19, 2006 || Mount Lemmon || Mount Lemmon Survey || V || align=right data-sort-value="0.82" | 820 m || 
|-id=316 bgcolor=#E9E9E9
| 422316 ||  || — || April 7, 2008 || Mount Lemmon || Mount Lemmon Survey || WIT || align=right | 1.1 km || 
|-id=317 bgcolor=#fefefe
| 422317 ||  || — || April 19, 1998 || Kitt Peak || Spacewatch || — || align=right data-sort-value="0.97" | 970 m || 
|-id=318 bgcolor=#E9E9E9
| 422318 ||  || — || December 21, 2001 || Kitt Peak || Spacewatch || AGN || align=right | 1.3 km || 
|-id=319 bgcolor=#d6d6d6
| 422319 ||  || — || October 1, 2003 || Kitt Peak || Spacewatch || — || align=right | 3.4 km || 
|-id=320 bgcolor=#fefefe
| 422320 ||  || — || March 23, 2006 || Kitt Peak || Spacewatch || — || align=right data-sort-value="0.82" | 820 m || 
|-id=321 bgcolor=#fefefe
| 422321 ||  || — || September 19, 2007 || Kitt Peak || Spacewatch || — || align=right data-sort-value="0.75" | 750 m || 
|-id=322 bgcolor=#fefefe
| 422322 ||  || — || December 18, 2001 || Socorro || LINEAR || — || align=right data-sort-value="0.68" | 680 m || 
|-id=323 bgcolor=#fefefe
| 422323 ||  || — || October 10, 2004 || Kitt Peak || Spacewatch || — || align=right data-sort-value="0.91" | 910 m || 
|-id=324 bgcolor=#fefefe
| 422324 ||  || — || December 29, 2008 || Mount Lemmon || Mount Lemmon Survey || — || align=right data-sort-value="0.69" | 690 m || 
|-id=325 bgcolor=#fefefe
| 422325 ||  || — || October 9, 2007 || Mount Lemmon || Mount Lemmon Survey || — || align=right | 1.1 km || 
|-id=326 bgcolor=#E9E9E9
| 422326 ||  || — || November 23, 2006 || Kitt Peak || Spacewatch || — || align=right | 1.5 km || 
|-id=327 bgcolor=#E9E9E9
| 422327 ||  || — || April 29, 2000 || Kitt Peak || Spacewatch || — || align=right | 1.5 km || 
|-id=328 bgcolor=#d6d6d6
| 422328 ||  || — || August 23, 2003 || Palomar || NEAT || — || align=right | 2.8 km || 
|-id=329 bgcolor=#d6d6d6
| 422329 ||  || — || January 8, 2010 || Kitt Peak || Spacewatch || 7:4 || align=right | 4.1 km || 
|-id=330 bgcolor=#d6d6d6
| 422330 ||  || — || December 10, 1998 || Kitt Peak || Spacewatch || — || align=right | 3.1 km || 
|-id=331 bgcolor=#d6d6d6
| 422331 ||  || — || October 20, 2003 || Kitt Peak || Spacewatch || — || align=right | 2.4 km || 
|-id=332 bgcolor=#d6d6d6
| 422332 ||  || — || September 29, 2003 || Socorro || LINEAR || — || align=right | 2.9 km || 
|-id=333 bgcolor=#fefefe
| 422333 ||  || — || August 16, 2006 || Siding Spring || SSS || V || align=right data-sort-value="0.72" | 720 m || 
|-id=334 bgcolor=#d6d6d6
| 422334 ||  || — || November 24, 2003 || Anderson Mesa || LONEOS || — || align=right | 3.1 km || 
|-id=335 bgcolor=#d6d6d6
| 422335 ||  || — || April 4, 2010 || WISE || WISE || — || align=right | 4.9 km || 
|-id=336 bgcolor=#d6d6d6
| 422336 ||  || — || June 30, 2008 || Kitt Peak || Spacewatch || — || align=right | 4.0 km || 
|-id=337 bgcolor=#d6d6d6
| 422337 ||  || — || September 20, 2003 || Kitt Peak || Spacewatch || — || align=right | 2.8 km || 
|-id=338 bgcolor=#E9E9E9
| 422338 ||  || — || April 11, 2013 || Mount Lemmon || Mount Lemmon Survey || EUN || align=right | 1.2 km || 
|-id=339 bgcolor=#d6d6d6
| 422339 ||  || — || March 9, 2002 || Kitt Peak || NEAT || KOR || align=right | 1.7 km || 
|-id=340 bgcolor=#fefefe
| 422340 ||  || — || October 19, 2003 || Kitt Peak || Spacewatch || V || align=right data-sort-value="0.84" | 840 m || 
|-id=341 bgcolor=#FA8072
| 422341 ||  || — || October 9, 2008 || Mount Lemmon || Mount Lemmon Survey || — || align=right data-sort-value="0.50" | 500 m || 
|-id=342 bgcolor=#d6d6d6
| 422342 ||  || — || October 26, 2009 || Kitt Peak || Spacewatch || — || align=right | 3.1 km || 
|-id=343 bgcolor=#E9E9E9
| 422343 ||  || — || January 10, 2007 || Kitt Peak || Spacewatch || — || align=right | 1.8 km || 
|-id=344 bgcolor=#fefefe
| 422344 ||  || — || January 8, 2002 || Socorro || LINEAR || — || align=right | 1.1 km || 
|-id=345 bgcolor=#fefefe
| 422345 ||  || — || September 22, 2003 || Kitt Peak || Spacewatch || — || align=right data-sort-value="0.79" | 790 m || 
|-id=346 bgcolor=#fefefe
| 422346 ||  || — || October 21, 2003 || Kitt Peak || Spacewatch || — || align=right data-sort-value="0.75" | 750 m || 
|-id=347 bgcolor=#fefefe
| 422347 ||  || — || March 8, 2005 || Mount Lemmon || Mount Lemmon Survey || — || align=right data-sort-value="0.64" | 640 m || 
|-id=348 bgcolor=#fefefe
| 422348 ||  || — || October 9, 2004 || Kitt Peak || Spacewatch || — || align=right data-sort-value="0.84" | 840 m || 
|-id=349 bgcolor=#E9E9E9
| 422349 ||  || — || September 19, 2001 || Kitt Peak || Spacewatch || EUN || align=right | 1.1 km || 
|-id=350 bgcolor=#d6d6d6
| 422350 ||  || — || October 21, 2003 || Palomar || NEAT || — || align=right | 3.4 km || 
|-id=351 bgcolor=#d6d6d6
| 422351 ||  || — || November 19, 2009 || Kitt Peak || Spacewatch || — || align=right | 3.3 km || 
|-id=352 bgcolor=#fefefe
| 422352 ||  || — || January 27, 2000 || Kitt Peak || Spacewatch || — || align=right data-sort-value="0.69" | 690 m || 
|-id=353 bgcolor=#d6d6d6
| 422353 ||  || — || October 8, 2008 || Mount Lemmon || Mount Lemmon Survey || — || align=right | 3.1 km || 
|-id=354 bgcolor=#d6d6d6
| 422354 ||  || — || October 12, 2009 || Mount Lemmon || Mount Lemmon Survey || EOS || align=right | 2.1 km || 
|-id=355 bgcolor=#fefefe
| 422355 ||  || — || October 9, 1999 || Kitt Peak || Spacewatch || — || align=right | 2.3 km || 
|-id=356 bgcolor=#d6d6d6
| 422356 ||  || — || September 26, 2008 || Mount Lemmon || Mount Lemmon Survey || — || align=right | 5.1 km || 
|-id=357 bgcolor=#E9E9E9
| 422357 ||  || — || August 26, 2000 || Socorro || LINEAR || — || align=right | 2.6 km || 
|-id=358 bgcolor=#d6d6d6
| 422358 ||  || — || September 21, 2003 || Kitt Peak || Spacewatch || — || align=right | 3.5 km || 
|-id=359 bgcolor=#d6d6d6
| 422359 ||  || — || March 9, 2002 || Kitt Peak || Spacewatch || KOR || align=right | 1.4 km || 
|-id=360 bgcolor=#fefefe
| 422360 ||  || — || April 9, 2002 || Kitt Peak || Spacewatch || — || align=right data-sort-value="0.73" | 730 m || 
|-id=361 bgcolor=#fefefe
| 422361 ||  || — || January 16, 2005 || Kitt Peak || Spacewatch || — || align=right data-sort-value="0.57" | 570 m || 
|-id=362 bgcolor=#E9E9E9
| 422362 ||  || — || April 6, 2003 || Kitt Peak || Spacewatch || — || align=right | 2.4 km || 
|-id=363 bgcolor=#d6d6d6
| 422363 ||  || — || October 19, 2003 || Kitt Peak || Spacewatch || — || align=right | 3.0 km || 
|-id=364 bgcolor=#d6d6d6
| 422364 ||  || — || September 28, 2003 || Anderson Mesa || LONEOS || LIX || align=right | 3.3 km || 
|-id=365 bgcolor=#fefefe
| 422365 ||  || — || October 9, 2004 || Socorro || LINEAR || — || align=right data-sort-value="0.78" | 780 m || 
|-id=366 bgcolor=#E9E9E9
| 422366 ||  || — || January 21, 2012 || Kitt Peak || Spacewatch || — || align=right | 2.1 km || 
|-id=367 bgcolor=#d6d6d6
| 422367 ||  || — || October 23, 2003 || Kitt Peak || Spacewatch || LIX || align=right | 3.1 km || 
|-id=368 bgcolor=#d6d6d6
| 422368 ||  || — || August 22, 2004 || Siding Spring || SSS || — || align=right | 3.7 km || 
|-id=369 bgcolor=#fefefe
| 422369 ||  || — || October 25, 2003 || Socorro || LINEAR || — || align=right data-sort-value="0.82" | 820 m || 
|-id=370 bgcolor=#fefefe
| 422370 ||  || — || September 17, 2004 || Kitt Peak || Spacewatch || — || align=right | 1.0 km || 
|-id=371 bgcolor=#d6d6d6
| 422371 ||  || — || August 1, 1998 || Caussols || ODAS || — || align=right | 3.4 km || 
|-id=372 bgcolor=#E9E9E9
| 422372 ||  || — || November 6, 2005 || Kitt Peak || Spacewatch || HOF || align=right | 2.4 km || 
|-id=373 bgcolor=#d6d6d6
| 422373 ||  || — || September 16, 2009 || Kitt Peak || Spacewatch || EOS || align=right | 1.8 km || 
|-id=374 bgcolor=#E9E9E9
| 422374 ||  || — || September 29, 2000 || Kitt Peak || Spacewatch || — || align=right | 2.5 km || 
|-id=375 bgcolor=#d6d6d6
| 422375 ||  || — || March 21, 2012 || Mount Lemmon || Mount Lemmon Survey || — || align=right | 3.2 km || 
|-id=376 bgcolor=#fefefe
| 422376 ||  || — || September 17, 2003 || Palomar || NEAT || — || align=right data-sort-value="0.79" | 790 m || 
|-id=377 bgcolor=#d6d6d6
| 422377 ||  || — || October 20, 2003 || Kitt Peak || Spacewatch || VER || align=right | 3.4 km || 
|-id=378 bgcolor=#FA8072
| 422378 ||  || — || October 12, 2006 || Siding Spring || SSS || H || align=right data-sort-value="0.71" | 710 m || 
|-id=379 bgcolor=#E9E9E9
| 422379 ||  || — || April 3, 2008 || Kitt Peak || Spacewatch || — || align=right | 2.1 km || 
|-id=380 bgcolor=#d6d6d6
| 422380 ||  || — || August 5, 2003 || Kitt Peak || Spacewatch || — || align=right | 5.0 km || 
|-id=381 bgcolor=#E9E9E9
| 422381 ||  || — || September 3, 2010 || Mount Lemmon || Mount Lemmon Survey || MAR || align=right | 1.5 km || 
|-id=382 bgcolor=#E9E9E9
| 422382 ||  || — || October 28, 2001 || Palomar || NEAT || — || align=right | 2.8 km || 
|-id=383 bgcolor=#fefefe
| 422383 ||  || — || August 28, 2006 || Catalina || CSS || — || align=right data-sort-value="0.92" | 920 m || 
|-id=384 bgcolor=#fefefe
| 422384 ||  || — || January 13, 2005 || Kitt Peak || Spacewatch || — || align=right data-sort-value="0.83" | 830 m || 
|-id=385 bgcolor=#fefefe
| 422385 ||  || — || May 7, 2006 || Mount Lemmon || Mount Lemmon Survey || — || align=right | 1.9 km || 
|-id=386 bgcolor=#fefefe
| 422386 ||  || — || November 27, 1995 || Kitt Peak || Spacewatch || — || align=right | 1.1 km || 
|-id=387 bgcolor=#d6d6d6
| 422387 ||  || — || September 29, 2003 || Socorro || LINEAR || — || align=right | 4.1 km || 
|-id=388 bgcolor=#E9E9E9
| 422388 ||  || — || December 27, 2006 || Mount Lemmon || Mount Lemmon Survey || — || align=right | 2.4 km || 
|-id=389 bgcolor=#d6d6d6
| 422389 ||  || — || March 15, 2007 || Mount Lemmon || Mount Lemmon Survey || — || align=right | 3.2 km || 
|-id=390 bgcolor=#E9E9E9
| 422390 ||  || — || April 30, 2009 || Kitt Peak || Spacewatch || MAR || align=right data-sort-value="0.93" | 930 m || 
|-id=391 bgcolor=#E9E9E9
| 422391 ||  || — || October 26, 2005 || Kitt Peak || Spacewatch || — || align=right | 2.4 km || 
|-id=392 bgcolor=#fefefe
| 422392 ||  || — || November 18, 2007 || Socorro || LINEAR || — || align=right data-sort-value="0.89" | 890 m || 
|-id=393 bgcolor=#fefefe
| 422393 ||  || — || September 10, 1998 || Caussols || ODAS || — || align=right data-sort-value="0.83" | 830 m || 
|-id=394 bgcolor=#E9E9E9
| 422394 ||  || — || August 21, 2001 || Kitt Peak || Spacewatch || — || align=right | 1.5 km || 
|-id=395 bgcolor=#E9E9E9
| 422395 ||  || — || December 9, 2006 || Palomar || NEAT || — || align=right | 1.1 km || 
|-id=396 bgcolor=#E9E9E9
| 422396 ||  || — || October 25, 2005 || Kitt Peak || Spacewatch || — || align=right | 2.3 km || 
|-id=397 bgcolor=#d6d6d6
| 422397 ||  || — || October 21, 2003 || Kitt Peak || Spacewatch || — || align=right | 3.4 km || 
|-id=398 bgcolor=#fefefe
| 422398 ||  || — || March 11, 2002 || Cima Ekar || ADAS || — || align=right data-sort-value="0.79" | 790 m || 
|-id=399 bgcolor=#d6d6d6
| 422399 ||  || — || November 25, 2005 || Kitt Peak || Spacewatch || KOR || align=right | 1.5 km || 
|-id=400 bgcolor=#fefefe
| 422400 ||  || — || August 9, 2010 || XuYi || PMO NEO || NYS || align=right data-sort-value="0.76" | 760 m || 
|}

422401–422500 

|-bgcolor=#d6d6d6
| 422401 ||  || — || August 15, 2002 || Kitt Peak || LONEOS || — || align=right | 4.6 km || 
|-id=402 bgcolor=#E9E9E9
| 422402 ||  || — || January 20, 2002 || Kitt Peak || Spacewatch || — || align=right | 1.7 km || 
|-id=403 bgcolor=#d6d6d6
| 422403 ||  || — || September 27, 2009 || Mount Lemmon || Mount Lemmon Survey || — || align=right | 3.0 km || 
|-id=404 bgcolor=#d6d6d6
| 422404 ||  || — || May 20, 2006 || Kitt Peak || Spacewatch || — || align=right | 3.7 km || 
|-id=405 bgcolor=#fefefe
| 422405 ||  || — || October 22, 2003 || Socorro || LINEAR || — || align=right data-sort-value="0.87" | 870 m || 
|-id=406 bgcolor=#E9E9E9
| 422406 ||  || — || October 22, 2005 || Kitt Peak || Spacewatch || AGN || align=right | 1.3 km || 
|-id=407 bgcolor=#fefefe
| 422407 ||  || — || November 17, 2007 || Kitt Peak || Spacewatch || NYS || align=right data-sort-value="0.54" | 540 m || 
|-id=408 bgcolor=#E9E9E9
| 422408 ||  || — || October 6, 2005 || Anderson Mesa || LONEOS || — || align=right | 2.3 km || 
|-id=409 bgcolor=#fefefe
| 422409 ||  || — || August 10, 2010 || Kitt Peak || Spacewatch || NYS || align=right data-sort-value="0.78" | 780 m || 
|-id=410 bgcolor=#E9E9E9
| 422410 ||  || — || December 1, 2005 || Mount Lemmon || Mount Lemmon Survey || — || align=right | 2.2 km || 
|-id=411 bgcolor=#fefefe
| 422411 ||  || — || September 10, 2007 || Mount Lemmon || Mount Lemmon Survey || — || align=right data-sort-value="0.68" | 680 m || 
|-id=412 bgcolor=#fefefe
| 422412 ||  || — || October 24, 2007 || Mount Lemmon || Mount Lemmon Survey || NYS || align=right data-sort-value="0.57" | 570 m || 
|-id=413 bgcolor=#fefefe
| 422413 ||  || — || September 17, 2010 || Catalina || CSS || — || align=right data-sort-value="0.94" | 940 m || 
|-id=414 bgcolor=#d6d6d6
| 422414 ||  || — || February 2, 2005 || Catalina || CSS || HYG || align=right | 2.5 km || 
|-id=415 bgcolor=#E9E9E9
| 422415 ||  || — || May 28, 2008 || Mount Lemmon || Mount Lemmon Survey || — || align=right | 2.1 km || 
|-id=416 bgcolor=#E9E9E9
| 422416 ||  || — || December 21, 2006 || Kitt Peak || L. H. Wasserman || — || align=right | 2.2 km || 
|-id=417 bgcolor=#E9E9E9
| 422417 ||  || — || November 25, 2005 || Mount Lemmon || Mount Lemmon Survey || — || align=right | 2.0 km || 
|-id=418 bgcolor=#E9E9E9
| 422418 ||  || — || November 8, 2010 || Kitt Peak || Spacewatch || — || align=right | 1.5 km || 
|-id=419 bgcolor=#fefefe
| 422419 ||  || — || August 24, 2003 || Bergisch Gladbach || M. W. Buie || — || align=right data-sort-value="0.74" | 740 m || 
|-id=420 bgcolor=#d6d6d6
| 422420 ||  || — || July 25, 2008 || Mount Lemmon || Mount Lemmon Survey || — || align=right | 3.0 km || 
|-id=421 bgcolor=#E9E9E9
| 422421 ||  || — || January 8, 2011 || Mount Lemmon || Mount Lemmon Survey || — || align=right | 2.5 km || 
|-id=422 bgcolor=#d6d6d6
| 422422 ||  || — || March 26, 1995 || Kitt Peak || Spacewatch || — || align=right | 4.1 km || 
|-id=423 bgcolor=#E9E9E9
| 422423 ||  || — || August 29, 2005 || Palomar || NEAT || JUN || align=right data-sort-value="0.97" | 970 m || 
|-id=424 bgcolor=#fefefe
| 422424 ||  || — || January 31, 2009 || Kitt Peak || Spacewatch || — || align=right | 1.1 km || 
|-id=425 bgcolor=#d6d6d6
| 422425 ||  || — || February 22, 2006 || Anderson Mesa || LONEOS || — || align=right | 3.9 km || 
|-id=426 bgcolor=#d6d6d6
| 422426 ||  || — || October 19, 2003 || Apache Point || SDSS || EOS || align=right | 1.8 km || 
|-id=427 bgcolor=#E9E9E9
| 422427 ||  || — || October 31, 2000 || Socorro || LINEAR || — || align=right | 2.4 km || 
|-id=428 bgcolor=#d6d6d6
| 422428 ||  || — || November 19, 2003 || Socorro || LINEAR || LIX || align=right | 3.7 km || 
|-id=429 bgcolor=#E9E9E9
| 422429 ||  || — || March 3, 2000 || Kitt Peak || Spacewatch || — || align=right | 1.2 km || 
|-id=430 bgcolor=#fefefe
| 422430 ||  || — || October 9, 2004 || Kitt Peak || Spacewatch || — || align=right data-sort-value="0.72" | 720 m || 
|-id=431 bgcolor=#d6d6d6
| 422431 ||  || — || October 3, 2003 || Kitt Peak || Spacewatch || — || align=right | 3.6 km || 
|-id=432 bgcolor=#d6d6d6
| 422432 ||  || — || March 2, 2006 || Mount Lemmon || Mount Lemmon Survey || — || align=right | 3.9 km || 
|-id=433 bgcolor=#E9E9E9
| 422433 ||  || — || October 7, 2000 || Kitt Peak || Spacewatch || GEF || align=right | 1.3 km || 
|-id=434 bgcolor=#E9E9E9
| 422434 ||  || — || January 10, 2003 || Socorro || LINEAR || EUN || align=right | 1.6 km || 
|-id=435 bgcolor=#E9E9E9
| 422435 ||  || — || September 19, 2001 || Socorro || LINEAR || — || align=right | 1.1 km || 
|-id=436 bgcolor=#fefefe
| 422436 ||  || — || February 24, 2006 || Kitt Peak || Spacewatch || — || align=right data-sort-value="0.76" | 760 m || 
|-id=437 bgcolor=#fefefe
| 422437 ||  || — || March 3, 2005 || Kitt Peak || Spacewatch || — || align=right data-sort-value="0.89" | 890 m || 
|-id=438 bgcolor=#fefefe
| 422438 ||  || — || September 18, 2006 || Catalina || CSS || — || align=right | 1.3 km || 
|-id=439 bgcolor=#E9E9E9
| 422439 ||  || — || October 29, 2005 || Kitt Peak || Spacewatch || AGN || align=right | 1.4 km || 
|-id=440 bgcolor=#E9E9E9
| 422440 ||  || — || September 26, 2005 || Kitt Peak || Spacewatch || — || align=right | 2.9 km || 
|-id=441 bgcolor=#fefefe
| 422441 ||  || — || April 9, 2003 || Palomar || NEAT || — || align=right data-sort-value="0.99" | 990 m || 
|-id=442 bgcolor=#fefefe
| 422442 ||  || — || August 20, 2003 || Barred Owl || NEAT || — || align=right data-sort-value="0.82" | 820 m || 
|-id=443 bgcolor=#d6d6d6
| 422443 ||  || — || October 1, 2003 || Kitt Peak || Spacewatch || — || align=right | 3.4 km || 
|-id=444 bgcolor=#d6d6d6
| 422444 ||  || — || May 10, 2008 || Siding Spring || SSS || — || align=right | 3.9 km || 
|-id=445 bgcolor=#E9E9E9
| 422445 ||  || — || November 1, 2005 || Mount Lemmon || Mount Lemmon Survey || — || align=right | 2.1 km || 
|-id=446 bgcolor=#fefefe
| 422446 ||  || — || October 10, 2007 || Kitt Peak || Spacewatch || — || align=right data-sort-value="0.87" | 870 m || 
|-id=447 bgcolor=#E9E9E9
| 422447 ||  || — || September 18, 2010 || Mount Lemmon || Mount Lemmon Survey || — || align=right | 1.5 km || 
|-id=448 bgcolor=#fefefe
| 422448 ||  || — || October 14, 2007 || Mount Lemmon || Mount Lemmon Survey || — || align=right data-sort-value="0.77" | 770 m || 
|-id=449 bgcolor=#E9E9E9
| 422449 ||  || — || October 21, 2001 || Socorro || LINEAR || — || align=right | 1.9 km || 
|-id=450 bgcolor=#d6d6d6
| 422450 ||  || — || February 4, 2006 || Kitt Peak || Spacewatch || — || align=right | 4.3 km || 
|-id=451 bgcolor=#E9E9E9
| 422451 ||  || — || October 24, 2005 || Kitt Peak || Spacewatch || MRX || align=right | 1.2 km || 
|-id=452 bgcolor=#d6d6d6
| 422452 ||  || — || October 16, 2003 || Kitt Peak || Spacewatch || — || align=right | 3.9 km || 
|-id=453 bgcolor=#d6d6d6
| 422453 ||  || — || October 18, 1998 || Kitt Peak || Spacewatch || — || align=right | 3.2 km || 
|-id=454 bgcolor=#E9E9E9
| 422454 ||  || — || May 17, 2005 || Mount Lemmon || Mount Lemmon Survey || — || align=right | 1.1 km || 
|-id=455 bgcolor=#fefefe
| 422455 ||  || — || October 2, 1999 || Kitt Peak || Spacewatch || — || align=right data-sort-value="0.75" | 750 m || 
|-id=456 bgcolor=#E9E9E9
| 422456 ||  || — || September 30, 2006 || Mount Lemmon || Mount Lemmon Survey || — || align=right data-sort-value="0.77" | 770 m || 
|-id=457 bgcolor=#d6d6d6
| 422457 ||  || — || September 14, 2006 || Kitt Peak || Spacewatch || SHU3:2 || align=right | 5.8 km || 
|-id=458 bgcolor=#E9E9E9
| 422458 ||  || — || February 28, 2008 || Mount Lemmon || Mount Lemmon Survey || — || align=right | 1.3 km || 
|-id=459 bgcolor=#fefefe
| 422459 ||  || — || December 21, 2003 || Kitt Peak || Spacewatch || — || align=right data-sort-value="0.76" | 760 m || 
|-id=460 bgcolor=#d6d6d6
| 422460 ||  || — || September 30, 2003 || Kitt Peak || Spacewatch || — || align=right | 2.4 km || 
|-id=461 bgcolor=#fefefe
| 422461 ||  || — || May 7, 2006 || Mount Lemmon || Mount Lemmon Survey || V || align=right data-sort-value="0.64" | 640 m || 
|-id=462 bgcolor=#d6d6d6
| 422462 ||  || — || December 19, 2004 || Kitt Peak || Spacewatch || — || align=right | 2.6 km || 
|-id=463 bgcolor=#fefefe
| 422463 ||  || — || June 21, 2010 || Mount Lemmon || Mount Lemmon Survey || — || align=right data-sort-value="0.85" | 850 m || 
|-id=464 bgcolor=#fefefe
| 422464 ||  || — || January 15, 2004 || Kitt Peak || Spacewatch || NYS || align=right data-sort-value="0.65" | 650 m || 
|-id=465 bgcolor=#d6d6d6
| 422465 ||  || — || November 17, 2009 || Kitt Peak || Spacewatch || EOS || align=right | 2.4 km || 
|-id=466 bgcolor=#d6d6d6
| 422466 ||  || — || April 19, 2007 || Kitt Peak || Spacewatch || — || align=right | 4.5 km || 
|-id=467 bgcolor=#E9E9E9
| 422467 ||  || — || September 29, 1997 || Kitt Peak || Spacewatch || ADE || align=right | 2.2 km || 
|-id=468 bgcolor=#d6d6d6
| 422468 ||  || — || May 2, 2006 || Mount Lemmon || Mount Lemmon Survey || HYG || align=right | 2.8 km || 
|-id=469 bgcolor=#d6d6d6
| 422469 ||  || — || February 27, 2006 || Mount Lemmon || Mount Lemmon Survey || — || align=right | 2.0 km || 
|-id=470 bgcolor=#d6d6d6
| 422470 ||  || — || September 23, 2008 || Mount Lemmon || Mount Lemmon Survey || — || align=right | 3.9 km || 
|-id=471 bgcolor=#fefefe
| 422471 ||  || — || September 1, 2010 || Socorro || LINEAR || MAS || align=right data-sort-value="0.71" | 710 m || 
|-id=472 bgcolor=#fefefe
| 422472 ||  || — || March 23, 2001 || Kitt Peak || B. Gladman || — || align=right data-sort-value="0.75" | 750 m || 
|-id=473 bgcolor=#E9E9E9
| 422473 ||  || — || August 27, 2005 || Kitt Peak || Spacewatch || — || align=right | 1.3 km || 
|-id=474 bgcolor=#d6d6d6
| 422474 ||  || — || October 20, 2003 || Palomar || NEAT || — || align=right | 5.4 km || 
|-id=475 bgcolor=#d6d6d6
| 422475 ||  || — || September 20, 2008 || Catalina || CSS || — || align=right | 4.8 km || 
|-id=476 bgcolor=#d6d6d6
| 422476 ||  || — || November 18, 2003 || Kitt Peak || Spacewatch || — || align=right | 2.5 km || 
|-id=477 bgcolor=#E9E9E9
| 422477 ||  || — || September 19, 2009 || Mount Lemmon || Mount Lemmon Survey || AGN || align=right | 1.1 km || 
|-id=478 bgcolor=#fefefe
| 422478 ||  || — || August 4, 2003 || Kitt Peak || Spacewatch || — || align=right data-sort-value="0.69" | 690 m || 
|-id=479 bgcolor=#d6d6d6
| 422479 ||  || — || September 23, 2008 || Mount Lemmon || Mount Lemmon Survey || — || align=right | 3.7 km || 
|-id=480 bgcolor=#fefefe
| 422480 ||  || — || November 20, 2003 || Socorro || LINEAR || — || align=right | 1.2 km || 
|-id=481 bgcolor=#E9E9E9
| 422481 ||  || — || October 27, 2005 || Kitt Peak || Spacewatch || — || align=right | 2.8 km || 
|-id=482 bgcolor=#d6d6d6
| 422482 ||  || — || March 3, 2006 || Mount Lemmon || Mount Lemmon Survey || EOS || align=right | 2.0 km || 
|-id=483 bgcolor=#fefefe
| 422483 ||  || — || December 9, 2004 || Kitt Peak || Spacewatch || — || align=right data-sort-value="0.69" | 690 m || 
|-id=484 bgcolor=#E9E9E9
| 422484 ||  || — || August 26, 2005 || Palomar || NEAT || — || align=right | 1.7 km || 
|-id=485 bgcolor=#E9E9E9
| 422485 ||  || — || March 26, 2008 || Mount Lemmon || Mount Lemmon Survey || — || align=right | 1.5 km || 
|-id=486 bgcolor=#E9E9E9
| 422486 ||  || — || May 1, 2003 || Kitt Peak || Spacewatch || 526 || align=right | 2.2 km || 
|-id=487 bgcolor=#E9E9E9
| 422487 ||  || — || November 6, 2005 || Kitt Peak || Spacewatch || AGN || align=right | 1.3 km || 
|-id=488 bgcolor=#fefefe
| 422488 ||  || — || October 20, 2003 || Kitt Peak || Spacewatch || NYS || align=right data-sort-value="0.65" | 650 m || 
|-id=489 bgcolor=#E9E9E9
| 422489 ||  || — || October 25, 2005 || Mount Lemmon || Mount Lemmon Survey || — || align=right | 2.1 km || 
|-id=490 bgcolor=#fefefe
| 422490 ||  || — || November 4, 1999 || Kitt Peak || Spacewatch || NYS || align=right data-sort-value="0.76" | 760 m || 
|-id=491 bgcolor=#d6d6d6
| 422491 ||  || — || March 6, 2006 || Kitt Peak || Spacewatch || — || align=right | 2.0 km || 
|-id=492 bgcolor=#d6d6d6
| 422492 ||  || — || September 22, 2003 || Kitt Peak || Spacewatch || — || align=right | 4.0 km || 
|-id=493 bgcolor=#E9E9E9
| 422493 ||  || — || August 31, 2005 || Kitt Peak || Spacewatch || — || align=right | 1.9 km || 
|-id=494 bgcolor=#fefefe
| 422494 ||  || — || October 9, 2004 || Kitt Peak || Spacewatch || — || align=right data-sort-value="0.62" | 620 m || 
|-id=495 bgcolor=#E9E9E9
| 422495 ||  || — || November 12, 2001 || Socorro || LINEAR || — || align=right | 1.7 km || 
|-id=496 bgcolor=#E9E9E9
| 422496 ||  || — || October 21, 2006 || Mount Lemmon || Mount Lemmon Survey || MAR || align=right | 1.0 km || 
|-id=497 bgcolor=#E9E9E9
| 422497 ||  || — || December 13, 2006 || Mount Lemmon || Mount Lemmon Survey || — || align=right | 1.3 km || 
|-id=498 bgcolor=#fefefe
| 422498 ||  || — || October 1, 2009 || Mount Lemmon || Mount Lemmon Survey || H || align=right data-sort-value="0.81" | 810 m || 
|-id=499 bgcolor=#E9E9E9
| 422499 ||  || — || October 30, 2005 || Catalina || CSS || — || align=right | 2.9 km || 
|-id=500 bgcolor=#d6d6d6
| 422500 ||  || — || October 19, 2003 || Kitt Peak || Spacewatch || — || align=right | 4.4 km || 
|}

422501–422600 

|-bgcolor=#d6d6d6
| 422501 ||  || — || February 9, 2005 || Mount Lemmon || Mount Lemmon Survey || — || align=right | 2.4 km || 
|-id=502 bgcolor=#E9E9E9
| 422502 ||  || — || August 4, 2010 || WISE || WISE || — || align=right | 1.2 km || 
|-id=503 bgcolor=#fefefe
| 422503 ||  || — || December 18, 2007 || Mount Lemmon || Mount Lemmon Survey || NYS || align=right data-sort-value="0.65" | 650 m || 
|-id=504 bgcolor=#d6d6d6
| 422504 ||  || — || November 18, 2003 || Kitt Peak || Spacewatch || — || align=right | 3.7 km || 
|-id=505 bgcolor=#fefefe
| 422505 ||  || — || September 16, 2003 || Kitt Peak || Spacewatch || — || align=right data-sort-value="0.65" | 650 m || 
|-id=506 bgcolor=#fefefe
| 422506 ||  || — || September 7, 2004 || Kitt Peak || Spacewatch || — || align=right data-sort-value="0.55" | 550 m || 
|-id=507 bgcolor=#fefefe
| 422507 ||  || — || October 29, 2003 || Kitt Peak || Spacewatch || — || align=right | 1.0 km || 
|-id=508 bgcolor=#fefefe
| 422508 ||  || — || September 18, 2003 || Kitt Peak || Spacewatch || — || align=right data-sort-value="0.60" | 600 m || 
|-id=509 bgcolor=#d6d6d6
| 422509 ||  || — || October 15, 2004 || Kitt Peak || Spacewatch || KOR || align=right | 1.3 km || 
|-id=510 bgcolor=#d6d6d6
| 422510 ||  || — || November 20, 2009 || Kitt Peak || Spacewatch || — || align=right | 2.4 km || 
|-id=511 bgcolor=#E9E9E9
| 422511 ||  || — || December 24, 2006 || Mount Lemmon || Mount Lemmon Survey || (5) || align=right data-sort-value="0.98" | 980 m || 
|-id=512 bgcolor=#E9E9E9
| 422512 ||  || — || October 9, 2001 || Kitt Peak || Spacewatch || — || align=right | 1.6 km || 
|-id=513 bgcolor=#d6d6d6
| 422513 ||  || — || October 24, 2003 || Socorro || LINEAR || — || align=right | 3.5 km || 
|-id=514 bgcolor=#fefefe
| 422514 ||  || — || November 3, 2007 || Mount Lemmon || Mount Lemmon Survey || — || align=right data-sort-value="0.75" | 750 m || 
|-id=515 bgcolor=#E9E9E9
| 422515 ||  || — || August 27, 2005 || Palomar || NEAT || — || align=right | 1.5 km || 
|-id=516 bgcolor=#fefefe
| 422516 ||  || — || April 9, 2002 || Palomar || NEAT || — || align=right data-sort-value="0.92" | 920 m || 
|-id=517 bgcolor=#d6d6d6
| 422517 ||  || — || November 10, 2009 || Kitt Peak || Spacewatch || — || align=right | 2.3 km || 
|-id=518 bgcolor=#fefefe
| 422518 ||  || — || December 16, 2007 || Mount Lemmon || Mount Lemmon Survey || — || align=right data-sort-value="0.80" | 800 m || 
|-id=519 bgcolor=#d6d6d6
| 422519 ||  || — || September 28, 2008 || Catalina || CSS || — || align=right | 3.1 km || 
|-id=520 bgcolor=#d6d6d6
| 422520 ||  || — || October 4, 2004 || Kitt Peak || Spacewatch || — || align=right | 2.9 km || 
|-id=521 bgcolor=#E9E9E9
| 422521 ||  || — || September 25, 2009 || Mount Lemmon || Mount Lemmon Survey || — || align=right | 3.2 km || 
|-id=522 bgcolor=#fefefe
| 422522 ||  || — || August 28, 2006 || Catalina || CSS || — || align=right data-sort-value="0.83" | 830 m || 
|-id=523 bgcolor=#d6d6d6
| 422523 ||  || — || December 13, 2004 || Campo Imperatore || CINEOS || — || align=right | 2.7 km || 
|-id=524 bgcolor=#fefefe
| 422524 ||  || — || December 29, 2008 || Kitt Peak || Spacewatch || — || align=right data-sort-value="0.82" | 820 m || 
|-id=525 bgcolor=#E9E9E9
| 422525 ||  || — || October 29, 2005 || Catalina || CSS || — || align=right | 2.9 km || 
|-id=526 bgcolor=#d6d6d6
| 422526 ||  || — || October 26, 2009 || Mount Lemmon || Mount Lemmon Survey || — || align=right | 2.7 km || 
|-id=527 bgcolor=#d6d6d6
| 422527 ||  || — || December 11, 2004 || Kitt Peak || Spacewatch || — || align=right | 3.5 km || 
|-id=528 bgcolor=#E9E9E9
| 422528 ||  || — || November 4, 2005 || Kitt Peak || Spacewatch || AGN || align=right | 1.2 km || 
|-id=529 bgcolor=#E9E9E9
| 422529 ||  || — || December 27, 2006 || Mount Lemmon || Mount Lemmon Survey || — || align=right | 1.5 km || 
|-id=530 bgcolor=#d6d6d6
| 422530 ||  || — || September 16, 2003 || Kitt Peak || Spacewatch || — || align=right | 4.4 km || 
|-id=531 bgcolor=#d6d6d6
| 422531 ||  || — || September 28, 2003 || Kitt Peak || Spacewatch || — || align=right | 2.8 km || 
|-id=532 bgcolor=#d6d6d6
| 422532 ||  || — || October 1, 2003 || Kitt Peak || Spacewatch || EOS || align=right | 2.1 km || 
|-id=533 bgcolor=#E9E9E9
| 422533 ||  || — || November 1, 2005 || Mount Lemmon || Mount Lemmon Survey || AGN || align=right | 1.0 km || 
|-id=534 bgcolor=#d6d6d6
| 422534 ||  || — || November 14, 1998 || Kitt Peak || Spacewatch || THM || align=right | 2.8 km || 
|-id=535 bgcolor=#fefefe
| 422535 ||  || — || September 7, 1999 || Socorro || LINEAR || MAS || align=right data-sort-value="0.83" | 830 m || 
|-id=536 bgcolor=#d6d6d6
| 422536 ||  || — || October 2, 2003 || Kitt Peak || Spacewatch || THM || align=right | 2.4 km || 
|-id=537 bgcolor=#d6d6d6
| 422537 ||  || — || October 23, 1997 || Kitt Peak || Spacewatch || — || align=right | 2.2 km || 
|-id=538 bgcolor=#fefefe
| 422538 ||  || — || September 17, 2003 || Kitt Peak || Spacewatch || — || align=right data-sort-value="0.60" | 600 m || 
|-id=539 bgcolor=#fefefe
| 422539 ||  || — || November 19, 2003 || Kitt Peak || Spacewatch || NYS || align=right data-sort-value="0.60" | 600 m || 
|-id=540 bgcolor=#fefefe
| 422540 ||  || — || September 15, 1996 || Kitt Peak || Spacewatch || — || align=right data-sort-value="0.51" | 510 m || 
|-id=541 bgcolor=#fefefe
| 422541 ||  || — || May 5, 2006 || Kitt Peak || Spacewatch || NYS || align=right data-sort-value="0.50" | 500 m || 
|-id=542 bgcolor=#d6d6d6
| 422542 ||  || — || December 18, 2004 || Mount Lemmon || Mount Lemmon Survey || — || align=right | 2.6 km || 
|-id=543 bgcolor=#E9E9E9
| 422543 ||  || — || October 14, 2010 || Mount Lemmon || Mount Lemmon Survey || — || align=right | 1.4 km || 
|-id=544 bgcolor=#d6d6d6
| 422544 ||  || — || March 26, 2006 || Kitt Peak || Spacewatch || — || align=right | 4.0 km || 
|-id=545 bgcolor=#d6d6d6
| 422545 ||  || — || February 27, 2006 || Kitt Peak || Spacewatch || — || align=right | 3.5 km || 
|-id=546 bgcolor=#d6d6d6
| 422546 ||  || — || November 10, 2004 || Kitt Peak || Spacewatch || — || align=right | 3.0 km || 
|-id=547 bgcolor=#E9E9E9
| 422547 ||  || — || November 25, 2006 || Kitt Peak || Spacewatch || — || align=right | 1.3 km || 
|-id=548 bgcolor=#E9E9E9
| 422548 ||  || — || October 24, 2000 || Socorro || LINEAR || GEF || align=right | 1.6 km || 
|-id=549 bgcolor=#d6d6d6
| 422549 ||  || — || November 10, 2004 || Kitt Peak || M. W. Buie || — || align=right | 3.1 km || 
|-id=550 bgcolor=#E9E9E9
| 422550 ||  || — || October 12, 1993 || Kitt Peak || Spacewatch || — || align=right | 1.5 km || 
|-id=551 bgcolor=#E9E9E9
| 422551 ||  || — || September 28, 2006 || Kitt Peak || Spacewatch || — || align=right | 2.4 km || 
|-id=552 bgcolor=#d6d6d6
| 422552 ||  || — || December 18, 2003 || Socorro || LINEAR || — || align=right | 3.8 km || 
|-id=553 bgcolor=#fefefe
| 422553 ||  || — || January 9, 2000 || Kitt Peak || Spacewatch || — || align=right | 1.2 km || 
|-id=554 bgcolor=#E9E9E9
| 422554 ||  || — || November 6, 2010 || Mount Lemmon || Mount Lemmon Survey || (5) || align=right data-sort-value="0.96" | 960 m || 
|-id=555 bgcolor=#fefefe
| 422555 ||  || — || April 12, 2002 || Palomar || NEAT || H || align=right data-sort-value="0.63" | 630 m || 
|-id=556 bgcolor=#d6d6d6
| 422556 ||  || — || May 14, 2012 || Mount Lemmon || Mount Lemmon Survey || — || align=right | 3.9 km || 
|-id=557 bgcolor=#d6d6d6
| 422557 ||  || — || April 13, 2010 || WISE || WISE || LIX || align=right | 3.3 km || 
|-id=558 bgcolor=#fefefe
| 422558 ||  || — || October 21, 2003 || Socorro || LINEAR || — || align=right | 1.1 km || 
|-id=559 bgcolor=#E9E9E9
| 422559 ||  || — || October 17, 2001 || Socorro || LINEAR || — || align=right | 2.0 km || 
|-id=560 bgcolor=#fefefe
| 422560 ||  || — || August 16, 2006 || Siding Spring || SSS || — || align=right data-sort-value="0.83" | 830 m || 
|-id=561 bgcolor=#d6d6d6
| 422561 ||  || — || November 19, 2003 || Socorro || LINEAR || LIX || align=right | 3.6 km || 
|-id=562 bgcolor=#E9E9E9
| 422562 ||  || — || November 25, 2000 || Kitt Peak || Spacewatch || HOF || align=right | 2.6 km || 
|-id=563 bgcolor=#d6d6d6
| 422563 ||  || — || October 24, 2003 || Kitt Peak || Spacewatch || — || align=right | 3.7 km || 
|-id=564 bgcolor=#fefefe
| 422564 ||  || — || November 4, 2007 || Mount Lemmon || Mount Lemmon Survey || NYS || align=right | 1.0 km || 
|-id=565 bgcolor=#d6d6d6
| 422565 ||  || — || April 8, 1997 || Kitt Peak || Spacewatch || 615 || align=right | 2.0 km || 
|-id=566 bgcolor=#d6d6d6
| 422566 ||  || — || November 30, 2003 || Kitt Peak || Spacewatch || THM || align=right | 1.9 km || 
|-id=567 bgcolor=#d6d6d6
| 422567 ||  || — || September 25, 2003 || Palomar || NEAT || — || align=right | 3.2 km || 
|-id=568 bgcolor=#fefefe
| 422568 ||  || — || March 19, 1999 || Kitt Peak || Spacewatch || — || align=right data-sort-value="0.76" | 760 m || 
|-id=569 bgcolor=#E9E9E9
| 422569 ||  || — || April 11, 1996 || Kitt Peak || Spacewatch || — || align=right | 1.3 km || 
|-id=570 bgcolor=#fefefe
| 422570 ||  || — || December 30, 2008 || Kitt Peak || Spacewatch || — || align=right | 1.8 km || 
|-id=571 bgcolor=#fefefe
| 422571 ||  || — || September 26, 2003 || Socorro || LINEAR || — || align=right data-sort-value="0.99" | 990 m || 
|-id=572 bgcolor=#fefefe
| 422572 ||  || — || December 16, 1995 || Kitt Peak || Spacewatch || — || align=right data-sort-value="0.86" | 860 m || 
|-id=573 bgcolor=#d6d6d6
| 422573 ||  || — || October 19, 2003 || Kitt Peak || Spacewatch || EOS || align=right | 2.1 km || 
|-id=574 bgcolor=#d6d6d6
| 422574 ||  || — || January 25, 2006 || Kitt Peak || Spacewatch || — || align=right | 3.2 km || 
|-id=575 bgcolor=#C2FFFF
| 422575 ||  || — || March 5, 2006 || Kitt Peak || Spacewatch || L5 || align=right | 8.5 km || 
|-id=576 bgcolor=#d6d6d6
| 422576 ||  || — || February 24, 2006 || Kitt Peak || Spacewatch || — || align=right | 2.7 km || 
|-id=577 bgcolor=#E9E9E9
| 422577 ||  || — || July 3, 2005 || Mount Lemmon || Mount Lemmon Survey || — || align=right | 1.3 km || 
|-id=578 bgcolor=#d6d6d6
| 422578 ||  || — || March 8, 2005 || Mount Lemmon || Mount Lemmon Survey || — || align=right | 3.0 km || 
|-id=579 bgcolor=#E9E9E9
| 422579 ||  || — || November 22, 2005 || Kitt Peak || Spacewatch || — || align=right | 2.2 km || 
|-id=580 bgcolor=#E9E9E9
| 422580 ||  || — || August 21, 2004 || Siding Spring || SSS || AGN || align=right | 1.4 km || 
|-id=581 bgcolor=#fefefe
| 422581 ||  || — || October 10, 2007 || Mount Lemmon || Mount Lemmon Survey || — || align=right data-sort-value="0.85" | 850 m || 
|-id=582 bgcolor=#d6d6d6
| 422582 ||  || — || September 19, 2003 || Kitt Peak || Spacewatch || EOS || align=right | 1.8 km || 
|-id=583 bgcolor=#E9E9E9
| 422583 ||  || — || March 29, 2000 || Kitt Peak || Spacewatch || EUN || align=right | 1.3 km || 
|-id=584 bgcolor=#d6d6d6
| 422584 ||  || — || September 17, 2003 || Kitt Peak || Spacewatch || — || align=right | 2.1 km || 
|-id=585 bgcolor=#E9E9E9
| 422585 ||  || — || August 11, 2001 || Palomar || NEAT || — || align=right | 1.5 km || 
|-id=586 bgcolor=#E9E9E9
| 422586 ||  || — || August 14, 2001 || Haleakala || NEAT || — || align=right | 1.3 km || 
|-id=587 bgcolor=#fefefe
| 422587 ||  || — || August 13, 2010 || Kitt Peak || Spacewatch || — || align=right data-sort-value="0.71" | 710 m || 
|-id=588 bgcolor=#d6d6d6
| 422588 ||  || — || February 10, 2010 || WISE || WISE || EMA || align=right | 3.9 km || 
|-id=589 bgcolor=#fefefe
| 422589 ||  || — || September 13, 2004 || Anderson Mesa || LONEOS || — || align=right data-sort-value="0.63" | 630 m || 
|-id=590 bgcolor=#d6d6d6
| 422590 ||  || — || October 20, 2003 || Socorro || LINEAR || — || align=right | 3.3 km || 
|-id=591 bgcolor=#d6d6d6
| 422591 ||  || — || September 26, 2003 || Apache Point || SDSS || EOS || align=right | 2.2 km || 
|-id=592 bgcolor=#d6d6d6
| 422592 ||  || — || August 14, 2002 || Kitt Peak || Spacewatch || (1298) || align=right | 3.3 km || 
|-id=593 bgcolor=#E9E9E9
| 422593 ||  || — || November 6, 2010 || Kitt Peak || Spacewatch || — || align=right data-sort-value="0.87" | 870 m || 
|-id=594 bgcolor=#fefefe
| 422594 ||  || — || March 28, 2001 || Kitt Peak || Spacewatch || — || align=right | 1.0 km || 
|-id=595 bgcolor=#E9E9E9
| 422595 ||  || — || May 10, 2003 || Kitt Peak || Spacewatch || — || align=right | 3.0 km || 
|-id=596 bgcolor=#E9E9E9
| 422596 ||  || — || November 15, 2006 || Mount Lemmon || Mount Lemmon Survey || (5) || align=right | 1.1 km || 
|-id=597 bgcolor=#E9E9E9
| 422597 ||  || — || December 12, 2006 || Mount Lemmon || Mount Lemmon Survey || — || align=right | 1.4 km || 
|-id=598 bgcolor=#fefefe
| 422598 ||  || — || July 9, 2010 || WISE || WISE || SUL || align=right | 2.2 km || 
|-id=599 bgcolor=#d6d6d6
| 422599 ||  || — || September 16, 1998 || Kitt Peak || Spacewatch || — || align=right | 2.3 km || 
|-id=600 bgcolor=#d6d6d6
| 422600 ||  || — || October 29, 2003 || Kitt Peak || Spacewatch || — || align=right | 2.9 km || 
|}

422601–422700 

|-bgcolor=#d6d6d6
| 422601 ||  || — || March 5, 2006 || Kitt Peak || Spacewatch || TEL || align=right | 1.7 km || 
|-id=602 bgcolor=#d6d6d6
| 422602 ||  || — || December 13, 1999 || Kitt Peak || Spacewatch || — || align=right | 3.1 km || 
|-id=603 bgcolor=#fefefe
| 422603 ||  || — || January 1, 2001 || Kitt Peak || Spacewatch || NYS || align=right data-sort-value="0.60" | 600 m || 
|-id=604 bgcolor=#fefefe
| 422604 ||  || — || October 19, 2003 || Kitt Peak || SDSS || — || align=right data-sort-value="0.82" | 820 m || 
|-id=605 bgcolor=#d6d6d6
| 422605 ||  || — || February 1, 2005 || Kitt Peak || Spacewatch || HYG || align=right | 2.6 km || 
|-id=606 bgcolor=#d6d6d6
| 422606 ||  || — || November 27, 2009 || Mount Lemmon || Mount Lemmon Survey || — || align=right | 2.7 km || 
|-id=607 bgcolor=#fefefe
| 422607 ||  || — || January 22, 1998 || Kitt Peak || Spacewatch || — || align=right data-sort-value="0.77" | 770 m || 
|-id=608 bgcolor=#E9E9E9
| 422608 ||  || — || August 15, 2009 || Kitt Peak || Spacewatch || PAD || align=right | 1.6 km || 
|-id=609 bgcolor=#fefefe
| 422609 ||  || — || December 21, 2004 || Catalina || CSS || — || align=right data-sort-value="0.75" | 750 m || 
|-id=610 bgcolor=#fefefe
| 422610 ||  || — || January 1, 2008 || Kitt Peak || Spacewatch || — || align=right data-sort-value="0.68" | 680 m || 
|-id=611 bgcolor=#d6d6d6
| 422611 ||  || — || September 28, 2003 || Kitt Peak || Spacewatch || — || align=right | 2.0 km || 
|-id=612 bgcolor=#d6d6d6
| 422612 ||  || — || November 9, 2009 || Mount Lemmon || Mount Lemmon Survey || EOS || align=right | 5.0 km || 
|-id=613 bgcolor=#E9E9E9
| 422613 ||  || — || April 23, 2007 || Kitt Peak || Spacewatch || — || align=right | 3.2 km || 
|-id=614 bgcolor=#fefefe
| 422614 ||  || — || November 24, 2011 || Mount Lemmon || Mount Lemmon Survey || — || align=right data-sort-value="0.89" | 890 m || 
|-id=615 bgcolor=#d6d6d6
| 422615 ||  || — || September 16, 2003 || Kitt Peak || Spacewatch || — || align=right | 3.5 km || 
|-id=616 bgcolor=#E9E9E9
| 422616 ||  || — || November 1, 2005 || Mount Lemmon || Mount Lemmon Survey || — || align=right | 2.5 km || 
|-id=617 bgcolor=#d6d6d6
| 422617 ||  || — || September 29, 2008 || Kitt Peak || Spacewatch || — || align=right | 2.5 km || 
|-id=618 bgcolor=#E9E9E9
| 422618 ||  || — || October 23, 2006 || Mount Lemmon || Mount Lemmon Survey || — || align=right data-sort-value="0.97" | 970 m || 
|-id=619 bgcolor=#d6d6d6
| 422619 ||  || — || February 7, 1999 || Kitt Peak || Spacewatch || — || align=right | 4.2 km || 
|-id=620 bgcolor=#d6d6d6
| 422620 ||  || — || June 21, 2007 || Mount Lemmon || Mount Lemmon Survey || — || align=right | 3.8 km || 
|-id=621 bgcolor=#E9E9E9
| 422621 ||  || — || November 8, 2010 || Mount Lemmon || Mount Lemmon Survey || — || align=right data-sort-value="0.95" | 950 m || 
|-id=622 bgcolor=#d6d6d6
| 422622 ||  || — || November 11, 2009 || Kitt Peak || Spacewatch || — || align=right | 3.4 km || 
|-id=623 bgcolor=#E9E9E9
| 422623 ||  || — || March 30, 2008 || Kitt Peak || Spacewatch || MAR || align=right | 1.1 km || 
|-id=624 bgcolor=#d6d6d6
| 422624 ||  || — || March 23, 2012 || Mount Lemmon || Mount Lemmon Survey || — || align=right | 2.7 km || 
|-id=625 bgcolor=#fefefe
| 422625 ||  || — || March 10, 2005 || Catalina || CSS || — || align=right | 1.1 km || 
|-id=626 bgcolor=#d6d6d6
| 422626 ||  || — || March 28, 2011 || Mount Lemmon || Mount Lemmon Survey || — || align=right | 2.3 km || 
|-id=627 bgcolor=#E9E9E9
| 422627 ||  || — || January 17, 2007 || Kitt Peak || Spacewatch || — || align=right | 1.9 km || 
|-id=628 bgcolor=#E9E9E9
| 422628 ||  || — || August 28, 2005 || Kitt Peak || Spacewatch || — || align=right | 1.5 km || 
|-id=629 bgcolor=#E9E9E9
| 422629 ||  || — || November 6, 2002 || Socorro || LINEAR || — || align=right | 5.7 km || 
|-id=630 bgcolor=#E9E9E9
| 422630 || 2036 P-L || — || September 24, 1960 || Palomar || PLS || (5) || align=right | 1.1 km || 
|-id=631 bgcolor=#FA8072
| 422631 || 4165 P-L || — || September 24, 1960 || Palomar || PLS || — || align=right data-sort-value="0.67" | 670 m || 
|-id=632 bgcolor=#d6d6d6
| 422632 || 6510 P-L || — || September 24, 1960 || Palomar || PLS || — || align=right | 3.1 km || 
|-id=633 bgcolor=#E9E9E9
| 422633 || 1349 T-2 || — || September 29, 1973 || Palomar || PLS || — || align=right | 1.1 km || 
|-id=634 bgcolor=#E9E9E9
| 422634 || 2401 T-3 || — || October 12, 1977 || Palomar || PLS || — || align=right | 1.1 km || 
|-id=635 bgcolor=#E9E9E9
| 422635 || 2604 T-3 || — || October 16, 1977 || Palomar || PLS || — || align=right data-sort-value="0.93" | 930 m || 
|-id=636 bgcolor=#fefefe
| 422636 || 3375 T-3 || — || October 16, 1977 || Palomar || PLS || — || align=right data-sort-value="0.71" | 710 m || 
|-id=637 bgcolor=#FFC2E0
| 422637 || 1985 WA || — || November 16, 1985 || Palomar || C. S. Shoemaker || AMO +1kmcritical || align=right data-sort-value="0.89" | 890 m || 
|-id=638 bgcolor=#FFC2E0
| 422638 || 1994 CB || — || February 3, 1994 || Kitt Peak || Spacewatch || APO || align=right data-sort-value="0.19" | 190 m || 
|-id=639 bgcolor=#fefefe
| 422639 ||  || — || September 17, 1995 || Kitt Peak || Spacewatch || — || align=right data-sort-value="0.67" | 670 m || 
|-id=640 bgcolor=#d6d6d6
| 422640 ||  || — || September 18, 1995 || Kitt Peak || Spacewatch || — || align=right | 3.7 km || 
|-id=641 bgcolor=#fefefe
| 422641 ||  || — || September 18, 1995 || Kitt Peak || Spacewatch || — || align=right data-sort-value="0.76" | 760 m || 
|-id=642 bgcolor=#fefefe
| 422642 ||  || — || September 20, 1995 || Kitt Peak || Spacewatch || NYS || align=right data-sort-value="0.61" | 610 m || 
|-id=643 bgcolor=#fefefe
| 422643 ||  || — || September 20, 1995 || Kitt Peak || Spacewatch || MAS || align=right data-sort-value="0.69" | 690 m || 
|-id=644 bgcolor=#E9E9E9
| 422644 ||  || — || September 19, 1995 || Kitt Peak || Spacewatch || — || align=right | 2.0 km || 
|-id=645 bgcolor=#E9E9E9
| 422645 ||  || — || October 17, 1995 || Kitt Peak || Spacewatch || — || align=right | 1.7 km || 
|-id=646 bgcolor=#FA8072
| 422646 ||  || — || September 8, 1996 || Kitt Peak || Spacewatch || — || align=right data-sort-value="0.64" | 640 m || 
|-id=647 bgcolor=#E9E9E9
| 422647 ||  || — || September 6, 1996 || Kitt Peak || Spacewatch || EUN || align=right | 1.3 km || 
|-id=648 bgcolor=#FA8072
| 422648 ||  || — || November 11, 1996 || Kitt Peak || Spacewatch || — || align=right | 2.0 km || 
|-id=649 bgcolor=#d6d6d6
| 422649 ||  || — || November 9, 1996 || Kitt Peak || Spacewatch || — || align=right | 2.8 km || 
|-id=650 bgcolor=#fefefe
| 422650 ||  || — || November 4, 1996 || Kitt Peak || Spacewatch || — || align=right data-sort-value="0.57" | 570 m || 
|-id=651 bgcolor=#E9E9E9
| 422651 ||  || — || February 2, 1997 || Kitt Peak || Spacewatch || — || align=right | 1.4 km || 
|-id=652 bgcolor=#fefefe
| 422652 ||  || — || February 3, 1997 || Kitt Peak || Spacewatch || — || align=right data-sort-value="0.81" | 810 m || 
|-id=653 bgcolor=#d6d6d6
| 422653 || 1997 PO || — || August 1, 1997 || Haleakala || NEAT || Tj (2.97) || align=right | 3.9 km || 
|-id=654 bgcolor=#d6d6d6
| 422654 ||  || — || November 22, 1997 || Kitt Peak || Spacewatch || — || align=right | 3.9 km || 
|-id=655 bgcolor=#fefefe
| 422655 ||  || — || December 27, 1997 || Kitt Peak || Spacewatch || — || align=right data-sort-value="0.62" | 620 m || 
|-id=656 bgcolor=#d6d6d6
| 422656 || 1998 DL || — || February 18, 1998 || Modra || A. Galád, A. Pravda || — || align=right | 3.8 km || 
|-id=657 bgcolor=#fefefe
| 422657 || 1998 HN || — || April 17, 1998 || Kitt Peak || Spacewatch || — || align=right data-sort-value="0.61" | 610 m || 
|-id=658 bgcolor=#fefefe
| 422658 ||  || — || May 22, 1998 || Kitt Peak || Spacewatch || — || align=right data-sort-value="0.87" | 870 m || 
|-id=659 bgcolor=#FFC2E0
| 422659 || 1998 LD || — || June 3, 1998 || Socorro || LINEAR || AMO || align=right data-sort-value="0.34" | 340 m || 
|-id=660 bgcolor=#fefefe
| 422660 ||  || — || October 13, 1998 || Kitt Peak || Spacewatch || — || align=right data-sort-value="0.86" | 860 m || 
|-id=661 bgcolor=#d6d6d6
| 422661 ||  || — || November 14, 1998 || Kitt Peak || Spacewatch || KOR || align=right | 1.3 km || 
|-id=662 bgcolor=#fefefe
| 422662 ||  || — || May 12, 1999 || Anderson Mesa || LONEOS || — || align=right | 1.0 km || 
|-id=663 bgcolor=#fefefe
| 422663 ||  || — || September 5, 1999 || Catalina || CSS || — || align=right data-sort-value="0.95" | 950 m || 
|-id=664 bgcolor=#fefefe
| 422664 ||  || — || October 4, 1999 || Ondřejov || L. Kotková || — || align=right data-sort-value="0.89" | 890 m || 
|-id=665 bgcolor=#FA8072
| 422665 ||  || — || October 3, 1999 || Catalina || CSS || — || align=right data-sort-value="0.99" | 990 m || 
|-id=666 bgcolor=#FA8072
| 422666 ||  || — || October 3, 1999 || Socorro || LINEAR || — || align=right data-sort-value="0.96" | 960 m || 
|-id=667 bgcolor=#FA8072
| 422667 ||  || — || October 10, 1999 || Socorro || LINEAR || — || align=right data-sort-value="0.86" | 860 m || 
|-id=668 bgcolor=#fefefe
| 422668 ||  || — || October 31, 1999 || Kitt Peak || Spacewatch || — || align=right data-sort-value="0.62" | 620 m || 
|-id=669 bgcolor=#FA8072
| 422669 ||  || — || October 28, 1999 || Catalina || CSS || — || align=right data-sort-value="0.76" | 760 m || 
|-id=670 bgcolor=#fefefe
| 422670 ||  || — || October 19, 1999 || Kitt Peak || Spacewatch || — || align=right data-sort-value="0.59" | 590 m || 
|-id=671 bgcolor=#fefefe
| 422671 ||  || — || November 5, 1999 || Kitt Peak || Spacewatch || V || align=right data-sort-value="0.60" | 600 m || 
|-id=672 bgcolor=#E9E9E9
| 422672 ||  || — || November 9, 1999 || Socorro || LINEAR || — || align=right | 2.9 km || 
|-id=673 bgcolor=#E9E9E9
| 422673 ||  || — || October 21, 1999 || Socorro || LINEAR || DOR || align=right | 2.7 km || 
|-id=674 bgcolor=#E9E9E9
| 422674 ||  || — || October 13, 1999 || Socorro || LINEAR || AGN || align=right | 1.1 km || 
|-id=675 bgcolor=#E9E9E9
| 422675 ||  || — || November 9, 1999 || Kitt Peak || Spacewatch || — || align=right | 2.0 km || 
|-id=676 bgcolor=#fefefe
| 422676 ||  || — || November 9, 1999 || Socorro || LINEAR || NYS || align=right data-sort-value="0.63" | 630 m || 
|-id=677 bgcolor=#fefefe
| 422677 ||  || — || November 9, 1999 || Socorro || LINEAR || MAS || align=right data-sort-value="0.76" | 760 m || 
|-id=678 bgcolor=#E9E9E9
| 422678 ||  || — || November 3, 1999 || Kitt Peak || Spacewatch || — || align=right | 2.0 km || 
|-id=679 bgcolor=#FA8072
| 422679 ||  || — || November 5, 1999 || Socorro || LINEAR || — || align=right | 1.1 km || 
|-id=680 bgcolor=#fefefe
| 422680 ||  || — || November 9, 1999 || Socorro || LINEAR || — || align=right data-sort-value="0.96" | 960 m || 
|-id=681 bgcolor=#fefefe
| 422681 ||  || — || November 30, 1999 || Kitt Peak || Spacewatch || — || align=right | 1.0 km || 
|-id=682 bgcolor=#fefefe
| 422682 ||  || — || November 29, 1999 || Kitt Peak || Spacewatch || — || align=right data-sort-value="0.53" | 530 m || 
|-id=683 bgcolor=#d6d6d6
| 422683 ||  || — || December 6, 1999 || Socorro || LINEAR || — || align=right | 1.7 km || 
|-id=684 bgcolor=#d6d6d6
| 422684 ||  || — || December 7, 1999 || Kitt Peak || Spacewatch || KOR || align=right | 1.2 km || 
|-id=685 bgcolor=#fefefe
| 422685 ||  || — || December 7, 1999 || Kitt Peak || Spacewatch || NYS || align=right data-sort-value="0.63" | 630 m || 
|-id=686 bgcolor=#FFC2E0
| 422686 ||  || — || January 4, 2000 || Socorro || LINEAR || ATEPHA || align=right data-sort-value="0.18" | 180 m || 
|-id=687 bgcolor=#fefefe
| 422687 ||  || — || January 7, 2000 || Kitt Peak || Spacewatch || — || align=right data-sort-value="0.71" | 710 m || 
|-id=688 bgcolor=#fefefe
| 422688 ||  || — || January 26, 2000 || Kitt Peak || Spacewatch || — || align=right data-sort-value="0.84" | 840 m || 
|-id=689 bgcolor=#fefefe
| 422689 ||  || — || February 1, 2000 || Kitt Peak || Spacewatch || MAS || align=right data-sort-value="0.63" | 630 m || 
|-id=690 bgcolor=#d6d6d6
| 422690 ||  || — || March 29, 2000 || Kitt Peak || Spacewatch || — || align=right | 3.2 km || 
|-id=691 bgcolor=#d6d6d6
| 422691 || 2000 GA || — || April 1, 2000 || Kitt Peak || Spacewatch || — || align=right | 2.3 km || 
|-id=692 bgcolor=#fefefe
| 422692 ||  || — || April 5, 2000 || Socorro || LINEAR || — || align=right data-sort-value="0.80" | 800 m || 
|-id=693 bgcolor=#d6d6d6
| 422693 ||  || — || April 7, 2000 || Kitt Peak || Spacewatch || — || align=right | 2.8 km || 
|-id=694 bgcolor=#d6d6d6
| 422694 ||  || — || April 29, 2000 || Socorro || LINEAR || — || align=right | 2.6 km || 
|-id=695 bgcolor=#d6d6d6
| 422695 ||  || — || May 7, 2000 || Socorro || LINEAR || — || align=right | 3.4 km || 
|-id=696 bgcolor=#fefefe
| 422696 ||  || — || May 25, 2000 || Kitt Peak || Spacewatch || — || align=right data-sort-value="0.70" | 700 m || 
|-id=697 bgcolor=#E9E9E9
| 422697 ||  || — || July 30, 2000 || Prescott || P. G. Comba || — || align=right | 1.8 km || 
|-id=698 bgcolor=#E9E9E9
| 422698 ||  || — || July 29, 2000 || Anderson Mesa || LONEOS || — || align=right | 2.2 km || 
|-id=699 bgcolor=#FFC2E0
| 422699 ||  || — || August 1, 2000 || Socorro || LINEAR || APO +1kmPHA || align=right data-sort-value="0.62" | 620 m || 
|-id=700 bgcolor=#E9E9E9
| 422700 ||  || — || August 27, 2000 || Ondřejov || P. Kušnirák, P. Pravec || — || align=right | 1.6 km || 
|}

422701–422800 

|-bgcolor=#E9E9E9
| 422701 ||  || — || August 25, 2000 || Socorro || LINEAR || ADE || align=right | 2.5 km || 
|-id=702 bgcolor=#fefefe
| 422702 ||  || — || September 23, 2000 || Socorro || LINEAR || H || align=right data-sort-value="0.82" | 820 m || 
|-id=703 bgcolor=#E9E9E9
| 422703 ||  || — || September 24, 2000 || Socorro || LINEAR || — || align=right | 3.4 km || 
|-id=704 bgcolor=#E9E9E9
| 422704 ||  || — || September 24, 2000 || Socorro || LINEAR || EUN || align=right | 1.4 km || 
|-id=705 bgcolor=#fefefe
| 422705 ||  || — || September 24, 2000 || Socorro || LINEAR || — || align=right data-sort-value="0.98" | 980 m || 
|-id=706 bgcolor=#E9E9E9
| 422706 ||  || — || September 24, 2000 || Socorro || LINEAR || — || align=right | 1.8 km || 
|-id=707 bgcolor=#FA8072
| 422707 ||  || — || September 25, 2000 || Socorro || LINEAR || — || align=right | 1.6 km || 
|-id=708 bgcolor=#E9E9E9
| 422708 ||  || — || September 23, 2000 || Socorro || LINEAR || EUN || align=right | 1.5 km || 
|-id=709 bgcolor=#E9E9E9
| 422709 ||  || — || September 24, 2000 || Socorro || LINEAR || — || align=right | 2.7 km || 
|-id=710 bgcolor=#fefefe
| 422710 ||  || — || September 27, 2000 || Socorro || LINEAR || H || align=right data-sort-value="0.98" | 980 m || 
|-id=711 bgcolor=#d6d6d6
| 422711 ||  || — || September 24, 2000 || Socorro || LINEAR || 7:4* || align=right | 3.6 km || 
|-id=712 bgcolor=#E9E9E9
| 422712 ||  || — || September 26, 2000 || Socorro || LINEAR || — || align=right | 2.4 km || 
|-id=713 bgcolor=#fefefe
| 422713 ||  || — || October 1, 2000 || Socorro || LINEAR || — || align=right data-sort-value="0.72" | 720 m || 
|-id=714 bgcolor=#fefefe
| 422714 ||  || — || October 25, 2000 || Socorro || LINEAR || — || align=right data-sort-value="0.93" | 930 m || 
|-id=715 bgcolor=#FA8072
| 422715 ||  || — || November 16, 2000 || Kitt Peak || Spacewatch || — || align=right | 2.2 km || 
|-id=716 bgcolor=#FA8072
| 422716 ||  || — || November 29, 2000 || Kitt Peak || Spacewatch || — || align=right data-sort-value="0.88" | 880 m || 
|-id=717 bgcolor=#FA8072
| 422717 ||  || — || December 28, 2000 || Socorro || LINEAR || — || align=right data-sort-value="0.65" | 650 m || 
|-id=718 bgcolor=#E9E9E9
| 422718 ||  || — || December 28, 2000 || Kitt Peak || Spacewatch || — || align=right | 3.1 km || 
|-id=719 bgcolor=#FA8072
| 422719 ||  || — || January 2, 2001 || Socorro || LINEAR || — || align=right data-sort-value="0.98" | 980 m || 
|-id=720 bgcolor=#E9E9E9
| 422720 ||  || — || January 21, 2001 || Socorro || LINEAR || — || align=right | 2.4 km || 
|-id=721 bgcolor=#fefefe
| 422721 ||  || — || February 16, 2001 || Socorro || LINEAR || H || align=right data-sort-value="0.77" | 770 m || 
|-id=722 bgcolor=#E9E9E9
| 422722 ||  || — || February 19, 2001 || Socorro || LINEAR || — || align=right | 2.6 km || 
|-id=723 bgcolor=#E9E9E9
| 422723 ||  || — || March 2, 2001 || Anderson Mesa || LONEOS || — || align=right | 2.7 km || 
|-id=724 bgcolor=#FA8072
| 422724 ||  || — || March 23, 2001 || Anderson Mesa || LONEOS || — || align=right data-sort-value="0.89" | 890 m || 
|-id=725 bgcolor=#fefefe
| 422725 ||  || — || March 27, 2001 || Kitt Peak || Spacewatch || NYS || align=right data-sort-value="0.52" | 520 m || 
|-id=726 bgcolor=#fefefe
| 422726 ||  || — || March 22, 2001 || Kitt Peak || Spacewatch || — || align=right data-sort-value="0.77" | 770 m || 
|-id=727 bgcolor=#d6d6d6
| 422727 ||  || — || March 24, 2001 || Anderson Mesa || LONEOS || — || align=right | 3.3 km || 
|-id=728 bgcolor=#fefefe
| 422728 ||  || — || March 20, 2001 || Haleakala || NEAT || — || align=right data-sort-value="0.82" | 820 m || 
|-id=729 bgcolor=#FA8072
| 422729 ||  || — || July 13, 2001 || Palomar || NEAT || — || align=right | 1.3 km || 
|-id=730 bgcolor=#fefefe
| 422730 ||  || — || August 16, 2001 || Socorro || LINEAR || — || align=right | 2.4 km || 
|-id=731 bgcolor=#E9E9E9
| 422731 ||  || — || August 18, 2001 || Palomar || NEAT || — || align=right | 1.5 km || 
|-id=732 bgcolor=#E9E9E9
| 422732 ||  || — || August 23, 2001 || Anderson Mesa || LONEOS || — || align=right | 1.6 km || 
|-id=733 bgcolor=#E9E9E9
| 422733 ||  || — || August 24, 2001 || Anderson Mesa || LONEOS || — || align=right | 1.5 km || 
|-id=734 bgcolor=#E9E9E9
| 422734 ||  || — || September 8, 2001 || Socorro || LINEAR || — || align=right data-sort-value="0.86" | 860 m || 
|-id=735 bgcolor=#E9E9E9
| 422735 ||  || — || September 11, 2001 || Anderson Mesa || LONEOS || — || align=right | 1.3 km || 
|-id=736 bgcolor=#E9E9E9
| 422736 ||  || — || September 12, 2001 || Socorro || LINEAR || — || align=right data-sort-value="0.89" | 890 m || 
|-id=737 bgcolor=#E9E9E9
| 422737 ||  || — || September 12, 2001 || Socorro || LINEAR || — || align=right | 1.3 km || 
|-id=738 bgcolor=#E9E9E9
| 422738 ||  || — || September 16, 2001 || Socorro || LINEAR || EUN || align=right | 1.4 km || 
|-id=739 bgcolor=#E9E9E9
| 422739 ||  || — || September 16, 2001 || Socorro || LINEAR || (5) || align=right | 1.0 km || 
|-id=740 bgcolor=#d6d6d6
| 422740 ||  || — || September 20, 2001 || Socorro || LINEAR || — || align=right | 3.5 km || 
|-id=741 bgcolor=#fefefe
| 422741 ||  || — || September 20, 2001 || Socorro || LINEAR || — || align=right data-sort-value="0.59" | 590 m || 
|-id=742 bgcolor=#d6d6d6
| 422742 ||  || — || September 20, 2001 || Socorro || LINEAR || — || align=right | 3.2 km || 
|-id=743 bgcolor=#FA8072
| 422743 ||  || — || September 20, 2001 || Socorro || LINEAR || — || align=right | 1.5 km || 
|-id=744 bgcolor=#E9E9E9
| 422744 ||  || — || September 16, 2001 || Socorro || LINEAR || (5) || align=right data-sort-value="0.77" | 770 m || 
|-id=745 bgcolor=#fefefe
| 422745 ||  || — || September 19, 2001 || Socorro || LINEAR || — || align=right data-sort-value="0.96" | 960 m || 
|-id=746 bgcolor=#d6d6d6
| 422746 ||  || — || August 25, 2001 || Kitt Peak || Spacewatch || — || align=right | 2.8 km || 
|-id=747 bgcolor=#E9E9E9
| 422747 ||  || — || September 19, 2001 || Socorro || LINEAR || — || align=right data-sort-value="0.87" | 870 m || 
|-id=748 bgcolor=#fefefe
| 422748 ||  || — || September 19, 2001 || Socorro || LINEAR || — || align=right data-sort-value="0.57" | 570 m || 
|-id=749 bgcolor=#d6d6d6
| 422749 ||  || — || September 11, 2001 || Kitt Peak || Spacewatch || — || align=right | 3.6 km || 
|-id=750 bgcolor=#E9E9E9
| 422750 ||  || — || September 17, 2001 || Anderson Mesa || LONEOS || — || align=right | 1.0 km || 
|-id=751 bgcolor=#E9E9E9
| 422751 ||  || — || September 25, 2001 || Desert Eagle || W. K. Y. Yeung || — || align=right | 1.3 km || 
|-id=752 bgcolor=#E9E9E9
| 422752 ||  || — || September 26, 2001 || Socorro || LINEAR || — || align=right | 2.4 km || 
|-id=753 bgcolor=#E9E9E9
| 422753 ||  || — || September 29, 2001 || Palomar || NEAT || — || align=right | 1.4 km || 
|-id=754 bgcolor=#E9E9E9
| 422754 ||  || — || September 22, 2001 || Socorro || LINEAR || (5) || align=right data-sort-value="0.81" | 810 m || 
|-id=755 bgcolor=#E9E9E9
| 422755 ||  || — || September 21, 2001 || Socorro || LINEAR || — || align=right | 1.5 km || 
|-id=756 bgcolor=#E9E9E9
| 422756 ||  || — || September 25, 2001 || Socorro || LINEAR || EUN || align=right | 1.2 km || 
|-id=757 bgcolor=#FA8072
| 422757 ||  || — || October 15, 2001 || Haleakala || NEAT || — || align=right | 1.1 km || 
|-id=758 bgcolor=#E9E9E9
| 422758 ||  || — || October 14, 2001 || Socorro || LINEAR || ADE || align=right | 2.9 km || 
|-id=759 bgcolor=#E9E9E9
| 422759 ||  || — || October 15, 2001 || Palomar || NEAT || — || align=right | 1.2 km || 
|-id=760 bgcolor=#E9E9E9
| 422760 ||  || — || October 11, 2001 || Palomar || NEAT || — || align=right | 1.2 km || 
|-id=761 bgcolor=#E9E9E9
| 422761 ||  || — || October 14, 2001 || Socorro || LINEAR || — || align=right data-sort-value="0.71" | 710 m || 
|-id=762 bgcolor=#E9E9E9
| 422762 ||  || — || October 14, 2001 || Apache Point || SDSS || — || align=right data-sort-value="0.75" | 750 m || 
|-id=763 bgcolor=#E9E9E9
| 422763 ||  || — || October 14, 2001 || Apache Point || SDSS || KON || align=right | 2.7 km || 
|-id=764 bgcolor=#E9E9E9
| 422764 ||  || — || October 17, 2001 || Socorro || LINEAR || — || align=right | 1.1 km || 
|-id=765 bgcolor=#E9E9E9
| 422765 ||  || — || October 17, 2001 || Socorro || LINEAR || — || align=right | 1.7 km || 
|-id=766 bgcolor=#E9E9E9
| 422766 ||  || — || October 17, 2001 || Socorro || LINEAR || — || align=right data-sort-value="0.89" | 890 m || 
|-id=767 bgcolor=#E9E9E9
| 422767 ||  || — || October 17, 2001 || Socorro || LINEAR || — || align=right | 1.1 km || 
|-id=768 bgcolor=#E9E9E9
| 422768 ||  || — || October 19, 2001 || Haleakala || NEAT || — || align=right data-sort-value="0.98" | 980 m || 
|-id=769 bgcolor=#E9E9E9
| 422769 ||  || — || October 21, 2001 || Socorro || LINEAR || — || align=right | 1.8 km || 
|-id=770 bgcolor=#d6d6d6
| 422770 ||  || — || October 13, 2001 || Kitt Peak || Spacewatch || — || align=right | 3.2 km || 
|-id=771 bgcolor=#E9E9E9
| 422771 ||  || — || October 22, 2001 || Palomar || NEAT || — || align=right | 1.5 km || 
|-id=772 bgcolor=#E9E9E9
| 422772 ||  || — || October 16, 2001 || Socorro || LINEAR || — || align=right | 1.5 km || 
|-id=773 bgcolor=#d6d6d6
| 422773 ||  || — || October 17, 2001 || Socorro || LINEAR || — || align=right | 3.6 km || 
|-id=774 bgcolor=#E9E9E9
| 422774 ||  || — || October 18, 2001 || Anderson Mesa || LONEOS || — || align=right | 1.2 km || 
|-id=775 bgcolor=#E9E9E9
| 422775 ||  || — || October 19, 2001 || Palomar || NEAT || — || align=right data-sort-value="0.77" | 770 m || 
|-id=776 bgcolor=#E9E9E9
| 422776 ||  || — || October 19, 2001 || Palomar || NEAT || — || align=right | 1.3 km || 
|-id=777 bgcolor=#fefefe
| 422777 ||  || — || October 19, 2001 || Palomar || NEAT || — || align=right data-sort-value="0.59" | 590 m || 
|-id=778 bgcolor=#E9E9E9
| 422778 ||  || — || October 21, 2001 || Socorro || LINEAR || — || align=right data-sort-value="0.88" | 880 m || 
|-id=779 bgcolor=#E9E9E9
| 422779 ||  || — || November 10, 2001 || Socorro || LINEAR || — || align=right | 1.3 km || 
|-id=780 bgcolor=#E9E9E9
| 422780 ||  || — || November 11, 2001 || Socorro || LINEAR || — || align=right | 1.7 km || 
|-id=781 bgcolor=#E9E9E9
| 422781 ||  || — || November 10, 2001 || Socorro || LINEAR || — || align=right | 1.9 km || 
|-id=782 bgcolor=#E9E9E9
| 422782 ||  || — || November 12, 2001 || Socorro || LINEAR || — || align=right | 1.5 km || 
|-id=783 bgcolor=#E9E9E9
| 422783 ||  || — || November 12, 2001 || Socorro || LINEAR || (5) || align=right data-sort-value="0.77" | 770 m || 
|-id=784 bgcolor=#E9E9E9
| 422784 ||  || — || November 12, 2001 || Socorro || LINEAR || — || align=right | 1.6 km || 
|-id=785 bgcolor=#E9E9E9
| 422785 ||  || — || November 10, 2001 || Socorro || LINEAR || — || align=right | 1.3 km || 
|-id=786 bgcolor=#C2FFFF
| 422786 ||  || — || November 12, 2001 || Apache Point || SDSS || L5 || align=right | 9.8 km || 
|-id=787 bgcolor=#FFC2E0
| 422787 ||  || — || November 17, 2001 || Socorro || LINEAR || APO +1kmPHA || align=right | 1.6 km || 
|-id=788 bgcolor=#E9E9E9
| 422788 ||  || — || November 17, 2001 || Socorro || LINEAR || EUN || align=right | 1.1 km || 
|-id=789 bgcolor=#E9E9E9
| 422789 ||  || — || October 13, 2001 || Kitt Peak || Spacewatch || — || align=right | 1.4 km || 
|-id=790 bgcolor=#E9E9E9
| 422790 ||  || — || November 17, 2001 || Socorro || LINEAR || — || align=right | 1.6 km || 
|-id=791 bgcolor=#E9E9E9
| 422791 ||  || — || November 18, 2001 || Socorro || LINEAR || — || align=right data-sort-value="0.62" | 620 m || 
|-id=792 bgcolor=#d6d6d6
| 422792 ||  || — || October 24, 2001 || Socorro || LINEAR || EOS || align=right | 2.5 km || 
|-id=793 bgcolor=#E9E9E9
| 422793 ||  || — || November 19, 2001 || Socorro || LINEAR || — || align=right data-sort-value="0.80" | 800 m || 
|-id=794 bgcolor=#E9E9E9
| 422794 ||  || — || October 17, 2001 || Socorro || LINEAR || JUN || align=right data-sort-value="0.99" | 990 m || 
|-id=795 bgcolor=#E9E9E9
| 422795 ||  || — || December 9, 2001 || Socorro || LINEAR || — || align=right | 1.5 km || 
|-id=796 bgcolor=#E9E9E9
| 422796 ||  || — || November 17, 2001 || Socorro || LINEAR || — || align=right | 1.8 km || 
|-id=797 bgcolor=#E9E9E9
| 422797 ||  || — || November 19, 2001 || Anderson Mesa || LONEOS || — || align=right | 1.1 km || 
|-id=798 bgcolor=#E9E9E9
| 422798 ||  || — || December 14, 2001 || Socorro || LINEAR || EUN || align=right | 1.4 km || 
|-id=799 bgcolor=#E9E9E9
| 422799 ||  || — || November 20, 2001 || Socorro || LINEAR || — || align=right | 2.0 km || 
|-id=800 bgcolor=#E9E9E9
| 422800 ||  || — || December 14, 2001 || Socorro || LINEAR || — || align=right | 2.5 km || 
|}

422801–422900 

|-bgcolor=#E9E9E9
| 422801 ||  || — || December 11, 2001 || Socorro || LINEAR || — || align=right | 1.5 km || 
|-id=802 bgcolor=#E9E9E9
| 422802 ||  || — || December 15, 2001 || Socorro || LINEAR || — || align=right | 1.9 km || 
|-id=803 bgcolor=#E9E9E9
| 422803 ||  || — || December 14, 2001 || Socorro || LINEAR || NEM || align=right | 3.0 km || 
|-id=804 bgcolor=#E9E9E9
| 422804 ||  || — || December 9, 2001 || Socorro || LINEAR || — || align=right | 2.0 km || 
|-id=805 bgcolor=#E9E9E9
| 422805 ||  || — || December 17, 2001 || Socorro || LINEAR || — || align=right | 1.9 km || 
|-id=806 bgcolor=#E9E9E9
| 422806 ||  || — || December 17, 2001 || Socorro || LINEAR || — || align=right data-sort-value="0.88" | 880 m || 
|-id=807 bgcolor=#E9E9E9
| 422807 ||  || — || December 18, 2001 || Socorro || LINEAR || (5) || align=right data-sort-value="0.78" | 780 m || 
|-id=808 bgcolor=#E9E9E9
| 422808 ||  || — || December 18, 2001 || Socorro || LINEAR || — || align=right | 1.6 km || 
|-id=809 bgcolor=#fefefe
| 422809 ||  || — || December 18, 2001 || Socorro || LINEAR || H || align=right data-sort-value="0.80" | 800 m || 
|-id=810 bgcolor=#E9E9E9
| 422810 ||  || — || December 17, 2001 || Socorro || LINEAR || — || align=right | 1.5 km || 
|-id=811 bgcolor=#E9E9E9
| 422811 ||  || — || December 9, 2001 || Socorro || LINEAR || — || align=right | 1.4 km || 
|-id=812 bgcolor=#fefefe
| 422812 ||  || — || January 6, 2002 || Kitt Peak || Spacewatch || (883) || align=right data-sort-value="0.62" | 620 m || 
|-id=813 bgcolor=#E9E9E9
| 422813 ||  || — || January 8, 2002 || Socorro || LINEAR || — || align=right | 1.5 km || 
|-id=814 bgcolor=#fefefe
| 422814 ||  || — || December 14, 2001 || Socorro || LINEAR || — || align=right data-sort-value="0.77" | 770 m || 
|-id=815 bgcolor=#E9E9E9
| 422815 ||  || — || January 13, 2002 || Socorro || LINEAR || — || align=right | 1.4 km || 
|-id=816 bgcolor=#fefefe
| 422816 ||  || — || January 7, 2002 || Anderson Mesa || LONEOS || H || align=right data-sort-value="0.94" | 940 m || 
|-id=817 bgcolor=#E9E9E9
| 422817 ||  || — || January 11, 2002 || Kitt Peak || Spacewatch || — || align=right | 1.7 km || 
|-id=818 bgcolor=#E9E9E9
| 422818 ||  || — || January 12, 2002 || Palomar || NEAT || — || align=right | 2.4 km || 
|-id=819 bgcolor=#fefefe
| 422819 ||  || — || January 21, 2002 || Socorro || LINEAR || H || align=right data-sort-value="0.81" | 810 m || 
|-id=820 bgcolor=#d6d6d6
| 422820 ||  || — || February 2, 2002 || Cima Ekar || ADAS || 7:4 || align=right | 3.5 km || 
|-id=821 bgcolor=#fefefe
| 422821 ||  || — || February 6, 2002 || Socorro || LINEAR || H || align=right data-sort-value="0.83" | 830 m || 
|-id=822 bgcolor=#E9E9E9
| 422822 ||  || — || January 13, 2002 || Socorro || LINEAR || (5) || align=right data-sort-value="0.81" | 810 m || 
|-id=823 bgcolor=#E9E9E9
| 422823 ||  || — || February 6, 2002 || Socorro || LINEAR || JUN || align=right | 1.1 km || 
|-id=824 bgcolor=#E9E9E9
| 422824 ||  || — || February 9, 2002 || Kitt Peak || Spacewatch || EUN || align=right | 1.6 km || 
|-id=825 bgcolor=#E9E9E9
| 422825 ||  || — || February 7, 2002 || Socorro || LINEAR || ADE || align=right | 2.8 km || 
|-id=826 bgcolor=#fefefe
| 422826 ||  || — || February 7, 2002 || Socorro || LINEAR || H || align=right | 1.0 km || 
|-id=827 bgcolor=#E9E9E9
| 422827 ||  || — || February 7, 2002 || Socorro || LINEAR || — || align=right | 2.2 km || 
|-id=828 bgcolor=#fefefe
| 422828 ||  || — || February 8, 2002 || Socorro || LINEAR || H || align=right data-sort-value="0.69" | 690 m || 
|-id=829 bgcolor=#E9E9E9
| 422829 ||  || — || February 10, 2002 || Socorro || LINEAR || — || align=right | 1.6 km || 
|-id=830 bgcolor=#E9E9E9
| 422830 ||  || — || February 10, 2002 || Socorro || LINEAR || — || align=right | 1.0 km || 
|-id=831 bgcolor=#E9E9E9
| 422831 ||  || — || February 11, 2002 || Socorro || LINEAR || — || align=right | 2.0 km || 
|-id=832 bgcolor=#E9E9E9
| 422832 ||  || — || February 7, 2002 || Palomar || NEAT || — || align=right | 2.5 km || 
|-id=833 bgcolor=#E9E9E9
| 422833 ||  || — || February 8, 2002 || Kitt Peak || M. W. Buie || — || align=right | 1.6 km || 
|-id=834 bgcolor=#fefefe
| 422834 ||  || — || February 10, 2002 || Socorro || LINEAR || — || align=right data-sort-value="0.85" | 850 m || 
|-id=835 bgcolor=#E9E9E9
| 422835 ||  || — || February 11, 2002 || Socorro || LINEAR || — || align=right | 1.9 km || 
|-id=836 bgcolor=#E9E9E9
| 422836 ||  || — || February 16, 2002 || Palomar || NEAT || — || align=right | 2.4 km || 
|-id=837 bgcolor=#E9E9E9
| 422837 ||  || — || February 20, 2002 || Kitt Peak || Spacewatch || — || align=right | 1.6 km || 
|-id=838 bgcolor=#E9E9E9
| 422838 ||  || — || March 9, 2002 || Palomar || NEAT || — || align=right | 5.3 km || 
|-id=839 bgcolor=#E9E9E9
| 422839 ||  || — || March 12, 2002 || Palomar || NEAT || — || align=right | 1.6 km || 
|-id=840 bgcolor=#E9E9E9
| 422840 ||  || — || March 13, 2002 || Socorro || LINEAR || — || align=right | 2.2 km || 
|-id=841 bgcolor=#E9E9E9
| 422841 ||  || — || March 9, 2002 || Socorro || LINEAR || — || align=right | 1.5 km || 
|-id=842 bgcolor=#fefefe
| 422842 ||  || — || February 11, 2002 || Socorro || LINEAR || H || align=right data-sort-value="0.71" | 710 m || 
|-id=843 bgcolor=#E9E9E9
| 422843 ||  || — || March 13, 2002 || Socorro || LINEAR || — || align=right | 1.6 km || 
|-id=844 bgcolor=#E9E9E9
| 422844 ||  || — || February 9, 2002 || Kitt Peak || Spacewatch || — || align=right | 2.6 km || 
|-id=845 bgcolor=#fefefe
| 422845 ||  || — || April 9, 2002 || Socorro || LINEAR || — || align=right data-sort-value="0.84" | 840 m || 
|-id=846 bgcolor=#E9E9E9
| 422846 ||  || — || April 9, 2002 || Anderson Mesa || LONEOS || ADE || align=right | 2.6 km || 
|-id=847 bgcolor=#fefefe
| 422847 ||  || — || April 10, 2002 || Socorro || LINEAR || — || align=right data-sort-value="0.59" | 590 m || 
|-id=848 bgcolor=#fefefe
| 422848 ||  || — || April 9, 2002 || Socorro || LINEAR || — || align=right data-sort-value="0.75" | 750 m || 
|-id=849 bgcolor=#E9E9E9
| 422849 ||  || — || April 15, 2002 || Palomar || NEAT || — || align=right | 1.3 km || 
|-id=850 bgcolor=#E9E9E9
| 422850 ||  || — || April 8, 2002 || Kitt Peak || Spacewatch || — || align=right | 1.6 km || 
|-id=851 bgcolor=#E9E9E9
| 422851 ||  || — || April 4, 2002 || Palomar || NEAT || — || align=right | 2.1 km || 
|-id=852 bgcolor=#fefefe
| 422852 ||  || — || May 7, 2002 || Palomar || NEAT || — || align=right data-sort-value="0.94" | 940 m || 
|-id=853 bgcolor=#fefefe
| 422853 ||  || — || May 9, 2002 || Socorro || LINEAR || — || align=right | 1.2 km || 
|-id=854 bgcolor=#fefefe
| 422854 ||  || — || May 5, 2002 || Palomar || NEAT || — || align=right | 1.0 km || 
|-id=855 bgcolor=#fefefe
| 422855 ||  || — || May 9, 2002 || Palomar || NEAT || — || align=right data-sort-value="0.68" | 680 m || 
|-id=856 bgcolor=#fefefe
| 422856 ||  || — || June 5, 2002 || Socorro || LINEAR || — || align=right data-sort-value="0.79" | 790 m || 
|-id=857 bgcolor=#fefefe
| 422857 ||  || — || June 3, 2002 || Socorro || LINEAR || — || align=right data-sort-value="0.90" | 900 m || 
|-id=858 bgcolor=#d6d6d6
| 422858 ||  || — || July 13, 2002 || Socorro || LINEAR || Tj (2.99) || align=right | 3.6 km || 
|-id=859 bgcolor=#E9E9E9
| 422859 ||  || — || July 14, 2002 || Palomar || NEAT || GEF || align=right | 1.5 km || 
|-id=860 bgcolor=#fefefe
| 422860 ||  || — || July 21, 2002 || Palomar || NEAT || — || align=right data-sort-value="0.83" | 830 m || 
|-id=861 bgcolor=#fefefe
| 422861 ||  || — || August 6, 2002 || Palomar || NEAT || MAS || align=right data-sort-value="0.67" | 670 m || 
|-id=862 bgcolor=#d6d6d6
| 422862 ||  || — || August 6, 2002 || Palomar || NEAT || — || align=right | 2.1 km || 
|-id=863 bgcolor=#d6d6d6
| 422863 ||  || — || August 11, 2002 || Palomar || NEAT || EOS || align=right | 2.1 km || 
|-id=864 bgcolor=#fefefe
| 422864 ||  || — || August 11, 2002 || Socorro || LINEAR || — || align=right | 1.5 km || 
|-id=865 bgcolor=#fefefe
| 422865 ||  || — || August 12, 2002 || Socorro || LINEAR || Vfast? || align=right data-sort-value="0.65" | 650 m || 
|-id=866 bgcolor=#fefefe
| 422866 ||  || — || August 14, 2002 || Socorro || LINEAR || — || align=right | 1.3 km || 
|-id=867 bgcolor=#d6d6d6
| 422867 ||  || — || August 13, 2002 || Socorro || LINEAR || — || align=right | 3.2 km || 
|-id=868 bgcolor=#fefefe
| 422868 ||  || — || August 8, 2002 || Palomar || S. F. Hönig || — || align=right data-sort-value="0.72" | 720 m || 
|-id=869 bgcolor=#fefefe
| 422869 ||  || — || August 8, 2002 || Palomar || S. F. Hönig || NYS || align=right data-sort-value="0.70" | 700 m || 
|-id=870 bgcolor=#fefefe
| 422870 ||  || — || August 8, 2002 || Palomar || NEAT || NYS || align=right data-sort-value="0.63" | 630 m || 
|-id=871 bgcolor=#fefefe
| 422871 ||  || — || August 7, 2002 || Palomar || NEAT || — || align=right | 1.0 km || 
|-id=872 bgcolor=#fefefe
| 422872 ||  || — || August 15, 2002 || Palomar || NEAT || — || align=right data-sort-value="0.91" | 910 m || 
|-id=873 bgcolor=#fefefe
| 422873 ||  || — || August 11, 2002 || Palomar || NEAT || — || align=right data-sort-value="0.65" | 650 m || 
|-id=874 bgcolor=#d6d6d6
| 422874 ||  || — || August 26, 2002 || Palomar || NEAT || — || align=right | 3.0 km || 
|-id=875 bgcolor=#d6d6d6
| 422875 ||  || — || August 14, 2002 || Kitt Peak || Spacewatch || — || align=right | 2.6 km || 
|-id=876 bgcolor=#d6d6d6
| 422876 ||  || — || August 16, 2002 || Socorro || LINEAR || — || align=right | 3.0 km || 
|-id=877 bgcolor=#fefefe
| 422877 ||  || — || August 29, 2002 || Palomar || NEAT || — || align=right | 1.1 km || 
|-id=878 bgcolor=#fefefe
| 422878 ||  || — || August 29, 2002 || Palomar || NEAT || MAS || align=right data-sort-value="0.68" | 680 m || 
|-id=879 bgcolor=#fefefe
| 422879 ||  || — || August 29, 2002 || Palomar || NEAT || NYS || align=right data-sort-value="0.69" | 690 m || 
|-id=880 bgcolor=#fefefe
| 422880 ||  || — || August 30, 2002 || Kitt Peak || Spacewatch || MAS || align=right data-sort-value="0.63" | 630 m || 
|-id=881 bgcolor=#fefefe
| 422881 ||  || — || August 29, 2002 || Palomar || S. F. Hönig || NYS || align=right data-sort-value="0.66" | 660 m || 
|-id=882 bgcolor=#fefefe
| 422882 ||  || — || August 17, 2002 || Palomar || A. Lowe || NYS || align=right data-sort-value="0.63" | 630 m || 
|-id=883 bgcolor=#fefefe
| 422883 ||  || — || August 17, 2002 || Palomar || NEAT || H || align=right data-sort-value="0.77" | 770 m || 
|-id=884 bgcolor=#d6d6d6
| 422884 ||  || — || August 17, 2002 || Palomar || NEAT || — || align=right | 2.4 km || 
|-id=885 bgcolor=#fefefe
| 422885 ||  || — || August 19, 2002 || Palomar || NEAT || — || align=right data-sort-value="0.82" | 820 m || 
|-id=886 bgcolor=#fefefe
| 422886 ||  || — || August 18, 2002 || Palomar || NEAT || — || align=right data-sort-value="0.77" | 770 m || 
|-id=887 bgcolor=#d6d6d6
| 422887 ||  || — || August 17, 2002 || Palomar || NEAT || — || align=right | 2.2 km || 
|-id=888 bgcolor=#fefefe
| 422888 ||  || — || August 18, 2002 || Palomar || NEAT || NYS || align=right data-sort-value="0.50" | 500 m || 
|-id=889 bgcolor=#d6d6d6
| 422889 ||  || — || August 12, 2002 || Anderson Mesa || LONEOS || — || align=right | 3.3 km || 
|-id=890 bgcolor=#d6d6d6
| 422890 ||  || — || August 17, 2002 || Palomar || NEAT || — || align=right | 2.2 km || 
|-id=891 bgcolor=#d6d6d6
| 422891 ||  || — || August 30, 2002 || Palomar || NEAT || EOS || align=right | 1.9 km || 
|-id=892 bgcolor=#d6d6d6
| 422892 ||  || — || January 29, 2000 || Kitt Peak || Spacewatch || — || align=right | 3.1 km || 
|-id=893 bgcolor=#E9E9E9
| 422893 ||  || — || September 4, 2002 || Palomar || NEAT || GEF || align=right | 1.6 km || 
|-id=894 bgcolor=#d6d6d6
| 422894 ||  || — || August 12, 2002 || Socorro || LINEAR || — || align=right | 3.5 km || 
|-id=895 bgcolor=#d6d6d6
| 422895 ||  || — || September 5, 2002 || Anderson Mesa || LONEOS || — || align=right | 3.1 km || 
|-id=896 bgcolor=#d6d6d6
| 422896 ||  || — || September 5, 2002 || Socorro || LINEAR || — || align=right | 3.6 km || 
|-id=897 bgcolor=#fefefe
| 422897 ||  || — || September 4, 2002 || Palomar || NEAT || — || align=right | 1.0 km || 
|-id=898 bgcolor=#fefefe
| 422898 ||  || — || September 5, 2002 || Socorro || LINEAR || — || align=right data-sort-value="0.87" | 870 m || 
|-id=899 bgcolor=#fefefe
| 422899 ||  || — || September 5, 2002 || Haleakala || NEAT || — || align=right data-sort-value="0.98" | 980 m || 
|-id=900 bgcolor=#d6d6d6
| 422900 ||  || — || September 11, 2002 || Palomar || NEAT || — || align=right | 2.8 km || 
|}

422901–423000 

|-bgcolor=#fefefe
| 422901 ||  || — || September 11, 2002 || Palomar || NEAT || — || align=right data-sort-value="0.79" | 790 m || 
|-id=902 bgcolor=#d6d6d6
| 422902 ||  || — || September 11, 2002 || Palomar || NEAT || — || align=right | 2.7 km || 
|-id=903 bgcolor=#d6d6d6
| 422903 ||  || — || September 11, 2002 || Palomar || NEAT || — || align=right | 2.5 km || 
|-id=904 bgcolor=#fefefe
| 422904 ||  || — || September 12, 2002 || Palomar || NEAT || — || align=right data-sort-value="0.81" | 810 m || 
|-id=905 bgcolor=#d6d6d6
| 422905 ||  || — || September 12, 2002 || Palomar || NEAT || — || align=right | 4.1 km || 
|-id=906 bgcolor=#d6d6d6
| 422906 ||  || — || September 13, 2002 || Socorro || LINEAR || — || align=right | 3.8 km || 
|-id=907 bgcolor=#d6d6d6
| 422907 ||  || — || September 12, 2002 || Palomar || NEAT || THM || align=right | 2.3 km || 
|-id=908 bgcolor=#fefefe
| 422908 ||  || — || September 14, 2002 || Palomar || NEAT || — || align=right data-sort-value="0.79" | 790 m || 
|-id=909 bgcolor=#fefefe
| 422909 ||  || — || September 13, 2002 || Anderson Mesa || LONEOS || — || align=right data-sort-value="0.87" | 870 m || 
|-id=910 bgcolor=#fefefe
| 422910 ||  || — || September 14, 2002 || Palomar || R. Matson || — || align=right data-sort-value="0.74" | 740 m || 
|-id=911 bgcolor=#d6d6d6
| 422911 ||  || — || September 13, 2002 || Palomar || NEAT || — || align=right | 2.5 km || 
|-id=912 bgcolor=#d6d6d6
| 422912 ||  || — || September 12, 2002 || Palomar || NEAT || — || align=right | 3.2 km || 
|-id=913 bgcolor=#fefefe
| 422913 ||  || — || September 15, 2002 || Palomar || NEAT || — || align=right data-sort-value="0.79" | 790 m || 
|-id=914 bgcolor=#d6d6d6
| 422914 ||  || — || September 4, 2002 || Palomar || NEAT || — || align=right | 2.3 km || 
|-id=915 bgcolor=#fefefe
| 422915 ||  || — || September 4, 2002 || Palomar || NEAT || — || align=right data-sort-value="0.68" | 680 m || 
|-id=916 bgcolor=#fefefe
| 422916 ||  || — || September 14, 2002 || Palomar || NEAT || — || align=right data-sort-value="0.59" | 590 m || 
|-id=917 bgcolor=#d6d6d6
| 422917 ||  || — || September 27, 2002 || Palomar || NEAT || — || align=right | 3.0 km || 
|-id=918 bgcolor=#d6d6d6
| 422918 ||  || — || September 27, 2002 || Palomar || NEAT || — || align=right | 3.9 km || 
|-id=919 bgcolor=#fefefe
| 422919 ||  || — || September 26, 2002 || Palomar || NEAT || NYS || align=right data-sort-value="0.69" | 690 m || 
|-id=920 bgcolor=#fefefe
| 422920 ||  || — || September 17, 2002 || Palomar || NEAT || — || align=right data-sort-value="0.78" | 780 m || 
|-id=921 bgcolor=#d6d6d6
| 422921 ||  || — || October 3, 2002 || Socorro || LINEAR || — || align=right | 2.6 km || 
|-id=922 bgcolor=#d6d6d6
| 422922 ||  || — || October 4, 2002 || Palomar || NEAT || — || align=right | 2.7 km || 
|-id=923 bgcolor=#d6d6d6
| 422923 ||  || — || October 4, 2002 || Palomar || NEAT || — || align=right | 2.8 km || 
|-id=924 bgcolor=#fefefe
| 422924 ||  || — || October 2, 2002 || Socorro || LINEAR || MAS || align=right data-sort-value="0.81" | 810 m || 
|-id=925 bgcolor=#fefefe
| 422925 ||  || — || October 2, 2002 || Haleakala || NEAT || — || align=right | 1.1 km || 
|-id=926 bgcolor=#d6d6d6
| 422926 ||  || — || October 4, 2002 || Socorro || LINEAR || — || align=right | 2.5 km || 
|-id=927 bgcolor=#d6d6d6
| 422927 ||  || — || October 3, 2002 || Palomar || NEAT || — || align=right | 3.4 km || 
|-id=928 bgcolor=#fefefe
| 422928 ||  || — || October 7, 2002 || Haleakala || NEAT || — || align=right data-sort-value="0.94" | 940 m || 
|-id=929 bgcolor=#d6d6d6
| 422929 ||  || — || October 9, 2002 || Kitt Peak || Spacewatch || THM || align=right | 2.3 km || 
|-id=930 bgcolor=#d6d6d6
| 422930 ||  || — || October 9, 2002 || Kitt Peak || Spacewatch || — || align=right | 2.3 km || 
|-id=931 bgcolor=#d6d6d6
| 422931 ||  || — || October 4, 2002 || Campo Imperatore || CINEOS || — || align=right | 2.4 km || 
|-id=932 bgcolor=#d6d6d6
| 422932 ||  || — || October 4, 2002 || Socorro || LINEAR || — || align=right | 3.0 km || 
|-id=933 bgcolor=#d6d6d6
| 422933 ||  || — || October 4, 2002 || Socorro || LINEAR || — || align=right | 2.2 km || 
|-id=934 bgcolor=#d6d6d6
| 422934 ||  || — || October 4, 2002 || Apache Point || SDSS || — || align=right | 2.7 km || 
|-id=935 bgcolor=#d6d6d6
| 422935 ||  || — || October 4, 2002 || Apache Point || SDSS || — || align=right | 2.9 km || 
|-id=936 bgcolor=#d6d6d6
| 422936 ||  || — || October 4, 2002 || Apache Point || SDSS || — || align=right | 2.4 km || 
|-id=937 bgcolor=#d6d6d6
| 422937 ||  || — || October 4, 2002 || Apache Point || SDSS || — || align=right | 3.1 km || 
|-id=938 bgcolor=#d6d6d6
| 422938 ||  || — || October 4, 2002 || Apache Point || SDSS || LIX || align=right | 3.5 km || 
|-id=939 bgcolor=#d6d6d6
| 422939 ||  || — || January 22, 1998 || Kitt Peak || Spacewatch || — || align=right | 4.1 km || 
|-id=940 bgcolor=#d6d6d6
| 422940 ||  || — || October 5, 2002 || Apache Point || SDSS || EOS || align=right | 1.7 km || 
|-id=941 bgcolor=#fefefe
| 422941 ||  || — || October 5, 2002 || Apache Point || SDSS || — || align=right data-sort-value="0.85" | 850 m || 
|-id=942 bgcolor=#fefefe
| 422942 ||  || — || October 10, 2002 || Apache Point || SDSS || NYS || align=right data-sort-value="0.53" | 530 m || 
|-id=943 bgcolor=#d6d6d6
| 422943 ||  || — || October 10, 2002 || Apache Point || SDSS || — || align=right | 2.2 km || 
|-id=944 bgcolor=#d6d6d6
| 422944 ||  || — || October 10, 2002 || Apache Point || SDSS || EOS || align=right | 2.2 km || 
|-id=945 bgcolor=#d6d6d6
| 422945 ||  || — || October 10, 2002 || Apache Point || SDSS || — || align=right | 2.7 km || 
|-id=946 bgcolor=#fefefe
| 422946 ||  || — || October 5, 2002 || Palomar || NEAT || — || align=right | 1.1 km || 
|-id=947 bgcolor=#d6d6d6
| 422947 ||  || — || October 29, 2002 || Apache Point || SDSS || — || align=right | 2.6 km || 
|-id=948 bgcolor=#d6d6d6
| 422948 ||  || — || October 29, 2002 || Apache Point || SDSS || — || align=right | 2.5 km || 
|-id=949 bgcolor=#d6d6d6
| 422949 ||  || — || October 31, 2002 || Palomar || NEAT || — || align=right | 3.2 km || 
|-id=950 bgcolor=#d6d6d6
| 422950 ||  || — || October 13, 2002 || Kitt Peak || Spacewatch || — || align=right | 3.3 km || 
|-id=951 bgcolor=#fefefe
| 422951 ||  || — || November 6, 2002 || Haleakala || NEAT || NYS || align=right data-sort-value="0.78" | 780 m || 
|-id=952 bgcolor=#fefefe
| 422952 ||  || — || November 13, 2002 || Socorro || LINEAR || NYS || align=right data-sort-value="0.70" | 700 m || 
|-id=953 bgcolor=#fefefe
| 422953 ||  || — || November 1, 2002 || Palomar || NEAT || — || align=right data-sort-value="0.90" | 900 m || 
|-id=954 bgcolor=#d6d6d6
| 422954 ||  || — || November 24, 2002 || Palomar || NEAT || — || align=right | 3.0 km || 
|-id=955 bgcolor=#E9E9E9
| 422955 ||  || — || November 24, 2002 || Palomar || NEAT || — || align=right | 1.4 km || 
|-id=956 bgcolor=#fefefe
| 422956 ||  || — || November 24, 2002 || Palomar || NEAT || — || align=right data-sort-value="0.89" | 890 m || 
|-id=957 bgcolor=#E9E9E9
| 422957 ||  || — || November 24, 2002 || Palomar || NEAT || — || align=right data-sort-value="0.65" | 650 m || 
|-id=958 bgcolor=#fefefe
| 422958 ||  || — || November 16, 2002 || Palomar || NEAT || — || align=right data-sort-value="0.99" | 990 m || 
|-id=959 bgcolor=#E9E9E9
| 422959 ||  || — || January 5, 2003 || Socorro || LINEAR || — || align=right | 1.8 km || 
|-id=960 bgcolor=#d6d6d6
| 422960 ||  || — || January 26, 2003 || Palomar || NEAT || — || align=right | 5.1 km || 
|-id=961 bgcolor=#fefefe
| 422961 ||  || — || January 27, 2003 || Anderson Mesa || LONEOS || — || align=right | 1.2 km || 
|-id=962 bgcolor=#E9E9E9
| 422962 ||  || — || January 29, 2003 || Kvistaberg || UDAS || — || align=right | 2.6 km || 
|-id=963 bgcolor=#E9E9E9
| 422963 ||  || — || February 1, 2003 || Socorro || LINEAR || — || align=right | 1.4 km || 
|-id=964 bgcolor=#E9E9E9
| 422964 ||  || — || February 3, 2003 || Socorro || LINEAR || — || align=right | 1.1 km || 
|-id=965 bgcolor=#E9E9E9
| 422965 ||  || — || March 9, 2003 || Socorro || LINEAR || — || align=right | 1.1 km || 
|-id=966 bgcolor=#E9E9E9
| 422966 ||  || — || March 9, 2003 || Anderson Mesa || LONEOS || — || align=right | 1.3 km || 
|-id=967 bgcolor=#E9E9E9
| 422967 ||  || — || March 24, 2003 || Haleakala || NEAT || — || align=right | 1.4 km || 
|-id=968 bgcolor=#E9E9E9
| 422968 ||  || — || March 24, 2003 || Kitt Peak || Spacewatch || — || align=right | 1.2 km || 
|-id=969 bgcolor=#E9E9E9
| 422969 ||  || — || March 24, 2003 || Kitt Peak || Spacewatch || — || align=right data-sort-value="0.78" | 780 m || 
|-id=970 bgcolor=#E9E9E9
| 422970 ||  || — || April 4, 2003 || Kitt Peak || Spacewatch || — || align=right data-sort-value="0.83" | 830 m || 
|-id=971 bgcolor=#E9E9E9
| 422971 ||  || — || April 9, 2003 || Kitt Peak || Spacewatch || — || align=right | 1.4 km || 
|-id=972 bgcolor=#E9E9E9
| 422972 ||  || — || April 8, 2003 || Socorro || LINEAR || — || align=right data-sort-value="0.94" | 940 m || 
|-id=973 bgcolor=#E9E9E9
| 422973 ||  || — || April 11, 2003 || Kitt Peak || Spacewatch || — || align=right | 2.9 km || 
|-id=974 bgcolor=#E9E9E9
| 422974 ||  || — || April 29, 2003 || Anderson Mesa || LONEOS || — || align=right | 1.8 km || 
|-id=975 bgcolor=#E9E9E9
| 422975 ||  || — || April 29, 2003 || Kitt Peak || Spacewatch || — || align=right data-sort-value="0.83" | 830 m || 
|-id=976 bgcolor=#E9E9E9
| 422976 ||  || — || May 25, 2003 || Kitt Peak || Spacewatch || KON || align=right | 2.8 km || 
|-id=977 bgcolor=#FFC2E0
| 422977 ||  || — || June 29, 2003 || Socorro || LINEAR || AMO || align=right data-sort-value="0.36" | 360 m || 
|-id=978 bgcolor=#fefefe
| 422978 ||  || — || July 22, 2003 || Campo Imperatore || CINEOS || — || align=right data-sort-value="0.77" | 770 m || 
|-id=979 bgcolor=#E9E9E9
| 422979 ||  || — || August 4, 2003 || Lake Tekapo || A. C. Gilmore, P. M. Kilmartin ||  || align=right | 2.8 km || 
|-id=980 bgcolor=#fefefe
| 422980 ||  || — || August 23, 2003 || Palomar || NEAT || H || align=right data-sort-value="0.70" | 700 m || 
|-id=981 bgcolor=#E9E9E9
| 422981 ||  || — || August 23, 2003 || Cerro Tololo || M. W. Buie || — || align=right | 3.4 km || 
|-id=982 bgcolor=#fefefe
| 422982 ||  || — || August 31, 2003 || Kitt Peak || Spacewatch || — || align=right data-sort-value="0.71" | 710 m || 
|-id=983 bgcolor=#E9E9E9
| 422983 ||  || — || September 2, 2003 || Socorro || LINEAR || — || align=right | 3.7 km || 
|-id=984 bgcolor=#E9E9E9
| 422984 ||  || — || September 15, 2003 || Palomar || NEAT || JUN || align=right | 1.2 km || 
|-id=985 bgcolor=#d6d6d6
| 422985 ||  || — || September 15, 2003 || Palomar || NEAT || — || align=right | 2.8 km || 
|-id=986 bgcolor=#fefefe
| 422986 ||  || — || September 16, 2003 || Kitt Peak || Spacewatch || — || align=right data-sort-value="0.64" | 640 m || 
|-id=987 bgcolor=#fefefe
| 422987 ||  || — || September 18, 2003 || Socorro || LINEAR || — || align=right data-sort-value="0.72" | 720 m || 
|-id=988 bgcolor=#FA8072
| 422988 ||  || — || September 17, 2003 || Palomar || NEAT || — || align=right data-sort-value="0.75" | 750 m || 
|-id=989 bgcolor=#E9E9E9
| 422989 ||  || — || September 18, 2003 || Palomar || NEAT || RAF || align=right | 1.0 km || 
|-id=990 bgcolor=#fefefe
| 422990 ||  || — || September 17, 2003 || Anderson Mesa || LONEOS || — || align=right | 1.4 km || 
|-id=991 bgcolor=#fefefe
| 422991 ||  || — || September 18, 2003 || Kitt Peak || Spacewatch || — || align=right data-sort-value="0.62" | 620 m || 
|-id=992 bgcolor=#d6d6d6
| 422992 ||  || — || September 20, 2003 || Kitt Peak || Spacewatch || TEL || align=right | 1.1 km || 
|-id=993 bgcolor=#fefefe
| 422993 ||  || — || September 20, 2003 || Kitt Peak || Spacewatch || — || align=right data-sort-value="0.67" | 670 m || 
|-id=994 bgcolor=#fefefe
| 422994 ||  || — || September 17, 2003 || Campo Imperatore || CINEOS || — || align=right data-sort-value="0.83" | 830 m || 
|-id=995 bgcolor=#fefefe
| 422995 ||  || — || September 21, 2003 || Campo Imperatore || CINEOS || — || align=right data-sort-value="0.75" | 750 m || 
|-id=996 bgcolor=#fefefe
| 422996 ||  || — || September 18, 2003 || Campo Imperatore || CINEOS || — || align=right | 1.1 km || 
|-id=997 bgcolor=#fefefe
| 422997 ||  || — || September 22, 2003 || Anderson Mesa || LONEOS || — || align=right data-sort-value="0.81" | 810 m || 
|-id=998 bgcolor=#E9E9E9
| 422998 ||  || — || September 18, 2003 || Anderson Mesa || LONEOS || — || align=right | 3.0 km || 
|-id=999 bgcolor=#fefefe
| 422999 ||  || — || September 28, 2003 || Socorro || LINEAR || — || align=right data-sort-value="0.66" | 660 m || 
|-id=000 bgcolor=#fefefe
| 423000 ||  || — || September 28, 2003 || Kitt Peak || Spacewatch || — || align=right data-sort-value="0.45" | 450 m || 
|}

References

External links 
 Discovery Circumstances: Numbered Minor Planets (420001)–(425000) (IAU Minor Planet Center)

0422